= IBM 30XX mainframe lines =

The IBM 30XX mainframe lines are a group of lines of high-end System/370-compatible mainframes.

- IBM 303X series - released in 1977.
- IBM 308X series - released in 1980.
- IBM 3090 series - released in 1985.
  - IBM ES/3090 series - released in 1988.

== See also ==
- IBM 4300 and IBM 9370 - low-end S/370 compatible mainframe lines
- Midrange computer

IBM mainframes
Preceded by IBM S/370	IBM 30XX mainframe lines	Succeeded by IBM S/390
