= IBM System/390 =

Line of mainframe computers

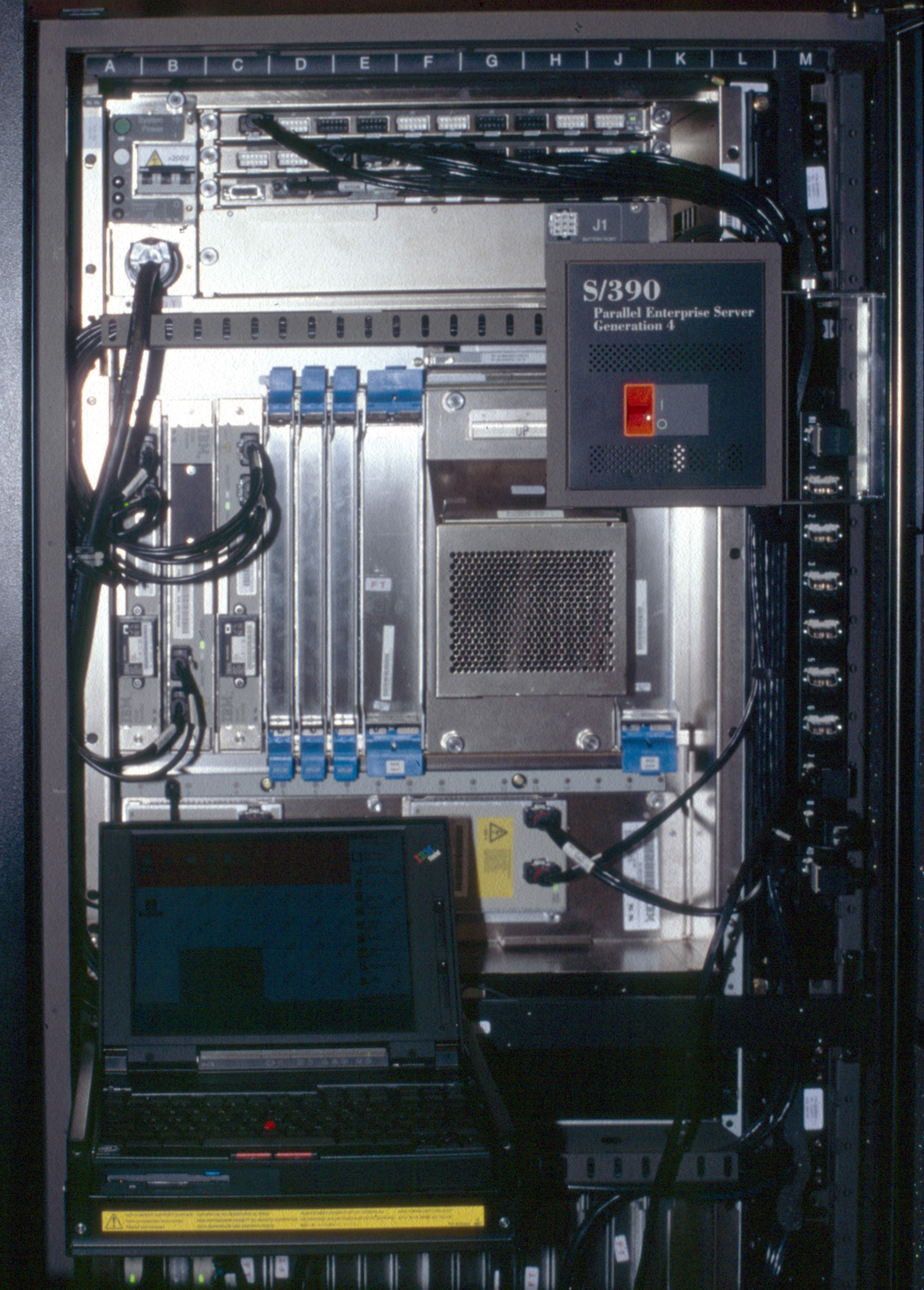
- Inside the IBM S/390 Parallel Enterprise Server Generation 4
- Manufacturer: International Business Machines Corporation (IBM)
- Type: mainframe (S/360-compatible)
- Released: September 5, 1990; 36 years ago
- Discontinued: December 31, 2004
- Operating system: MVS/ESA, OS/390, VSE/ESA and VM/ESA
- Memory: ES/9000: up to 2 GB main + 8 GB expanded 9672: up to 32 GB main (2 GB flat)
- Predecessor: IBM 3090, 4300 and 9370
- Successor: IBM Z
- Website: Official website IBM Archives "System/390 Announcement". IBM Archives. IBM. 23 January 2003. Archived from the original on January 16, 2005.

The IBM System/390 is a discontinued mainframe product family implementing ESA/390, the fifth generation of the System/360 instruction set architecture. The first computers to use the ESA/390 were the Enterprise System/9000 (ES/9000) family, which were introduced in 1990. These were followed by the 9672, Multiprise, and Integrated Server families of System/390 in 1994–1999, using CMOS microprocessors. The ESA/390 succeeded ESA/370, used in the Enhanced 3090 and 4381 "E" models, and the System/370 architecture last used in the IBM 9370 low-end mainframe. ESA/390 was succeeded by the 64-bit z/Architecture in 2000.

== History ==
On September 5, 1990, IBM published a group of hardware and software announcements, two of which included overviews of three announcements:

- System/390 (S/390), as in 360 for 1960s, 370 for 1970s.
- Enterprise System/9000 (ES/9000), which followed the convention set forth by the IBM PS/2 personal computer family and the IBM AS/400 minicomputer both created at the end of the 1980s.
- Enterprise Systems Architecture/390 (ESA/390) was IBM's last 31-bit-address/32-bit-data mainframe computing design, copied by Amdahl, Hitachi, and Fujitsu among other competitors. It was the successor of ESA/370 and, in turn, was succeeded by the 64-bit z/Architecture in 2000. Among other things, ESA/390 added fiber optics channels, known as Enterprise Systems Connection (ESCON) channels, to the parallel (Bus and Tag) channels of ESA/370.

Despite the fact that IBM mentioned the 9000 family first in some of the day's announcements, it was clear "by the end of the day" that it was "for System/390," although it was a shortened name, S/390, that was placed on some of the actual "boxes" later shipped. (Note: S/390 was also used on earlier and subsequent machines.)

The ES/9000 include rack-mounted models, free-standing air-cooled models and water-cooled models. The low-end models were substantially less expensive than the 3090 or 4381 previously needed to run MVS/ESA, and could also run VM/ESA and VSE/ESA, which IBM announced at the same time.

IBM periodically added named features to ESA/390 in conjunction with new processors; the ESA/390 Principles of Operation manual identifies them only by name, not by the processors supporting them.

Machines supporting the architecture were sold under the brand System/390 (S/390) from September 1990. The 9672 implementations of System/390 were the first high-end IBM mainframe architecture implemented first with CMOS CPU electronics rather than the traditional bipolar logic.

The IBM z13 was the last z Systems server to support running an operating system in ESA/390 architecture mode. However, all 24-bit and 31-bit problem-state application programs originally written to run on the ESA/390 architecture readily run unaffected by this change.

== S/390 computers ==
=== ES/9000 ===
Eighteen models (Note: Lower case "M") were announced September 5, 1990 for the ES/9000 in three form factors; the water-cooled 9021 to succeed the IBM 3090, and the air-cooled standalone 9121 and rack-mounted 9221 to succeed the IBM 4381 and 9370 respectively. The largest announced model had a 100-fold performance over the smallest model, and the clock frequency ranged from 67-111 MHz (15-9 ns) in the 9021 and 67 MHz in the 9121 to 26-33 MHz (38-30 ns) in the 9221. The 9221 models 120, 130 and 150 were initially available only with the "System/370 Base Option"; the "ESA Option" shipped in July 1991. The 9221 processors were made of VLSI CMOS chips designed in Böblingen, Germany, whence the 9672 line later originated.

The lower 6 of the 8 water-cooled models (codenamed H0) were immediately available, but used the same processor as the 3090-J, still at the 69 MHz (14.5 ns) maximum frequency and thus with unchanged performance. Those models' main difference from the 3090-J was the optional addition of ESCON, Sysplex and Integrated Cryptographic Feature. Only the models 900 and 820 had an all-new design (codenamed H2), (Note: Also Summit, a codename first denied and later seemingly mentioned by IBM.) featuring private split I+D 128+128 KB L1 caches and a shared 4 MB L2 cache (2 MB per side) with 11-cycle latency, more direct interconnects between the processors, multi-level TLBs, branch target buffer and 111 MHz (9 ns) clock frequency. These were the first models with out-of-order execution since the System/370-195 of 1973. However unlike the old S/360-91-derived systems, the models 900 and 820 had full out-of-order execution for both integer and floating-point units, with precise exception handling, and a fully superscalar pipeline. Models 820 and 900 shipped to customers in September 1991, a year later than the models with older technology. Later these new technologies were used in models 520, 640, 660, 740 and 860.

All three lines got additions and upgrades until 1993–1994. In February 1993 an 8-processor 141 MHz (7.1 ns) model 982 became available, with models 972, 962, 952, 942, 941, 831, 822, 821 and 711 following in March. These models, codenamed H5, had double the L2 cache and 30% higher per-processor performance than the H2 line, and added a hardware data compression. The compression was also included in the new, 50% faster models of the 9121. In April 1994, alongside the CMOS-based new 9672 series and improved 9221 models (with 40% faster cycle time and data compression), IBM announced also their ultimate bipolar model, the 10-processor model 9X2 rated at 468 MIPS, (Note: As explained by IBM, the MIPS ratings are varying estimates. Besides 468 MIPS, ratings of 465, 467, 475, 480, 484.5, and 485 MIPS exist. IBM's own publication also implies 485 MIPS, but later IBM rated it 510 MIPS. For different workloads different ratings exist, calculated from IBM's LSPR ratings, which can change with OS and microcode updates. Hence confusion. The rated MIPS should also not be confused with the theoretical maximum sustainable MIPS, which is 2817 for model 9X2.) to become available in October.

==== Models ====
ES/9000 water-cooled models (9021-###)
Model	CPUs	Sides	Max storage (main + expanded)	Max channels (Max ESCON)	Shipping from
H0 (340-based models)
720	6	2	0.5+4 GB	128 (64)	September 1990
620	4	2	0.5+4 GB	128 (64)	September 1990
580	3	1	0.25+2 GB	64 (32)	September 1990
500	2	1	0.25+2 GB	64 (32)	September 1990
340	1	1	128+1024 MB	64 (32)	September 1990
330	1	1	128+512 MB	64 (32)	"available by upgrade only"
H2 (520-based models)
900	6	2	1+8 GB	256 (256)	September 1991
860	5	2	1+8 GB	256 (256)	February 1992
820	4	2	1+8 GB	256 (256)	September 1991
740	3	1	0.5+4 GB	128 (128)	February 1992
660	2	2	0.5+4 GB	128 (128)	February 1992
640	2	1	0.5+4 GB	128 (128)	February 1992
520	1	1	0.25+2 GB	64 (64)	February 1992
H5 (711-based models)
9X2	10	2	2+8 GB	256 (256)	October 1994
982	8	2	2+8 GB	256 (256)	February 1993
972	7	2	2+8 GB	256 (256)	March 1993
962	6	2	2+8 GB	256 (256)	March 1993
952	5	2	2+8 GB	256 (256)	March 1993
942	4	2	2+8 GB	256 (256)	March 1993
941	4	1	1+4 GB	128 (128)	March 1993
832	3	2	1+4 GB	128 (128)	August 1993
831	3	1	1+4 GB	128 (128)	March 1993
822	2	2	1+4 GB	128 (128)	March 1993
821	2	1	1+4 GB	128 (128)	March 1993
711	1	1	0.5+2 GB	64 (64)	March 1993

ES/9000 air-cooled standalone models (9121-###)
Model	CPUs	Sides	Max storage (main + expanded)	Max channels (Max ESCON)	Shipping from
320-based models
610	4	2	512+1536 MB	96 (88)	March 1992
570	3	2	512+1536 MB	96 (88)	March 1992
490	2	2	512+1536 MB	96 (88)	March 1992
480	2	1	256+768 MB	48 (44) (Note: ESCON count was initially up to 36.)	March 1991
440	2	1	256+768 MB	48 (44)	March 1991
320	1	1	256+768 MB	48 (44)	September 1990
260	1	1	256+768 MB	48 (44)	September 1990
210	1	1	256+768 MB	48 (44)	January 1991
190	1	1	128+384 MB	32 (28) (Note: ESCON count was initially up to 20.)	March 1991
180	1	1	(Note: The combined capacity of the main memory and expanded storage is 512 MB.)	32 (28)	April 1992
511-based models
742	4	2	1+1 GB (Note: Initial capacity. Increase to 1+7 GB was scheduled for March 1994.)	128	May 1993
732	3	2	1+1 GB	128	May 1993
622	2	2	1+1 GB	128	May 1993
621	2	1	0.5+0.5 GB (Note: Initial capacity. Increase to 0.5+3.5 GB was scheduled for March 1994.)	64	February 1993
522	2	2	1+1 GB		November 1993
521	2	1	0.5+0.5 GB		May 1993
511	1	1			February 1993
411	1	1			May 1993
311	1	1			May 1993

ES/9000 air-cooled rack-mounted models (9221-###)
Model	CPUs	Max storage (main + expanded)	Max channels (Max ESCON)	Shipping from
170-based models
200	2	256 MB main	24 (24)	Q3 1992
170	1	256 MB main	24 (24)	Q4 1991
150	1	256 MB main	12 (12)	December 1990 (Note: ESA Option available from July 1991)
130	1	256 MB main	12 (12)	December 1990
120	1	256 MB main	12 (12)	December 1990
211-based models
421	2	512 MB	24 (24)	April 1994
221	2	512 MB		April 1994
211	1	512 MB		April 1994
201	1	512 MB		April 1994
191	1	512 MB		April 1994

==== ES/9000 features ====
- ESCON fiber optic channels
- Sysplex for synchronizing the systems to ease management
- Vector Facility: up to one vector processor per Central Processor available on the 9021 and 9121. First used on the 3090 to replace the IBM 3838 array processor announced in 1976 for System/370.
- Up to one Integrated Cryptographic Feature (ICRF) per side was available on the 9021 for accelerating encryption, succeeding the 3848 Cryptographic Unit.
- (Each Central Processor accommodates one coprocessor at a time; the combined number of installed Vector Facilities and ICRFs cannot exceed the number of Central Processors.)
- The new models of the 9021 and 9121 from 1993 and 9221 from 1994 feature data compression hardware.

==== Logical partitioning ====
Previously available only on IBM 3090, Logical Partitions (LPARs) are a standard feature of the ES/9000 processors whereby IBM's Processor Resource/Systems Manager (PR/SM) hypervisor allows different operating systems to run concurrently in separate logical partitions (LPARs), with a high degree of isolation. Initially 7 partitions per a disconnected side were supported. In December 1992 the LPAR capacity of the H2 (520-based) models was increased to 10 per a disconnected side. For example, a two-processor model 660 could now support up to 20 partitions instead of 14, if the two sides (each with one processor) are electrically isolated.

This was introduced as part of IBM's moving towards "lights-out" operation and increased control of multiple system configurations.

=== 9672 ===
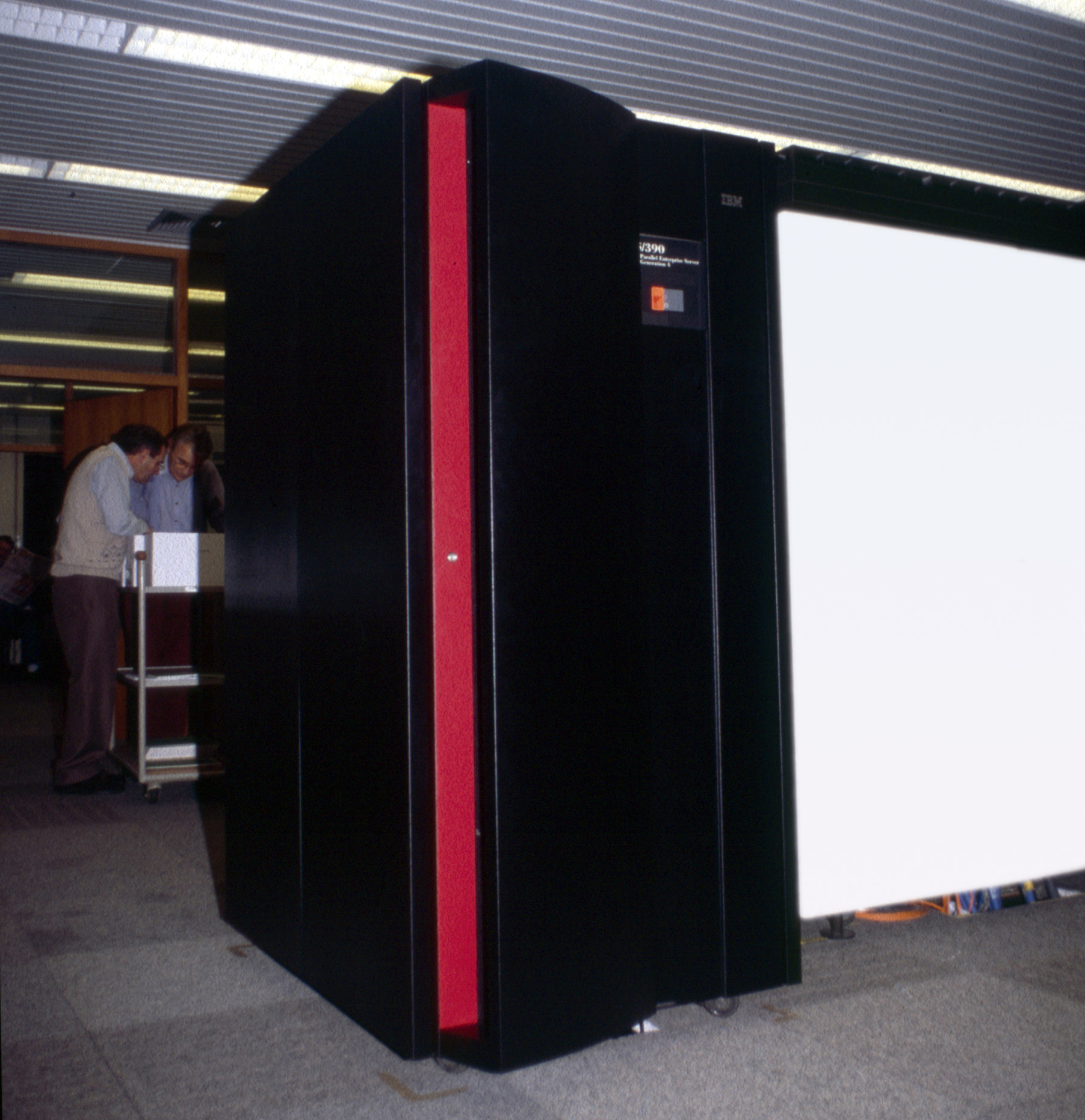
IBM S/390 Parallel Enterprise Server Gen4

Launched in 1994 first as the "Parallel Transaction Server" (alongside the 9673 "Parallel Query Server"), subsumed by the "Parallel Enterprise Server" launched later in the year, the six generations of the IBM 9672 machines transitioned IBM's mainframes fully to CMOS microprocessors, as by a strategic decision no more ES/9000 (bipolar-based except the 9221) models would be released after 1994. The initial generations of 9672 were slower than the largest ES/9000 sold in parallel, but the fifth and sixth generations were the most powerful and capable ESA/390 machines built by IBM.

Model	Year Introduced	Number of CPUs	Performance (MIPS) (Note: As warned by IBM, the MIPS ratings mostly are varying estimates by third parties. These are not comparable with RISC-vendors' MIPS claims.)	Memory (GB)
G1 – 9672-Rn1, 9672-Enn, 9672-Pnn	1994	1–6	15–66	0.125–2
G2 – 9672-Rn2, 9672-Rn3	1995	1–10	15–171	0.125–4
G3 – 9672-Rn4	1996	1–10	33–374	0.5–8
G4 – 9672-Rn5	1997	1–10	49–447	0.5–16
G5 – 9672-nn6	1998	1–10	88–1069	1–24
G6 – 9672-nn7	1999	1–12	178–1644	5–32

In the course of the generations, CPUs added more instructions and increased performance. The first three generations (G1 to G3) focused on low cost. The 4th generation was aimed at matching the performance of the last bipolar model, the 9021-9X2. It was decided to be accomplished by pursuing high clock frequencies. The G4 could reach 70% higher frequency than the G3 at silicon process parity, but it suffered a 23% IPC reduction from the G3. The initial G4-based models became available in June 1997, but it wasn't until the 370 MHz model RY5 (with a "Modular Cooling Unit") became available at the end of the year that a 9672 would almost match the 141 MHz model 9X2's performance. (Note: The performance gap between the 9X2 and RY5 reduced over time, as the OS and software were updated; at OS/390 V1 R1, the 9X2's advantage was 8%, but at V2 R4 it was 4%.) At 370 MHz it was the second-highest clocked microprocessor at the time, after the Alpha 21164 of DEC. The execution units in each G4 processor are duplicated for the purpose of error detection and correction. Arriving in late September 1998, the G5 more than doubled the performance over any previous IBM mainframe, and restored IBM's performance lead that had been lost to Hitachi's Skyline mainframes in 1995. The G5 operated at up to 500 MHz, again second only to the DEC Alphas into early 1999. The G5 also added support for the IEEE 754 floating-point formats. The thousandth G5 system shipped less than 100 days after the manufacturing began; the greatest ramping of production in S/390's history. In late May 1999 the G6 arrived featuring copper interconnects, raising the frequency to 637 MHz, higher than the fastest DEC machines at the time.

First Linux distributions were supported on G5, Multiprise 3000, and G6.

=== Other ===
In September 1996, IBM launched the S/390 Multiprise 2000, positioned below the 9672. It used the same technology as the 9672 G3, but it fit half as many processors (up to five) and its off-chip caches were smaller. The 9672 G3 and the Multiprise 2000 were the last versions to support pre-XA System/370 mode. In October 1997 models of Multiprise 2000 with an 11% higher performance were launched. The Multiprise 3000, based on the 9672 G5, became available in September 1999, featuring PCI buses.

The S/390 Integrated Server, an even lower-end S/390 system than Multiprise, shipped by the end of 1998. It emerged from a line of S/390-compatibility/coprocessor cards for PCs, but is a true S/390 system capable of server duties, having relegated the Pentium II to the role of an I/O coprocessor. It was the first S/390 server to support PCI. It had the same performance and 256 MB maximum memory capacity as the 7 years older low-end 9221 model 170.

From 1997 IBM also offered a "S/390 Application StarterPak", intended as a software development kit for developing and testing mainframe software.

== See also ==
- IBM System/360
- IBM System/370
- IBM 30XX mainframe lines
  - IBM 303X
  - IBM 308X
  - IBM 3090
- IBM Z

IBM mainframes
Preceded by Late IBM System/370 (IBM 3090, 4300 and 9370 series)	IBM System/390; 1990–2000: ES/9000; 1990–1994 / 9672; Parallel Transaction Server; 9673; Parallel Query Server; 1994 / 9672; Parallel Enterprise Server; 1994–2000 / Multiprise; 1996–2000 / Integrated Server; 1998–2000	Succeeded by IBM Z
