= Vector facility =

Vector facility may refer to:

- Vector facility on the IBM 3090
- Vector Facility for z/Architecture
- Vector processor
