= IBM Multiprise =

Discontinued series of IBM mainframes

- Developer: IBM
- Type: entry-level mainframe
- Released: 1996
- Discontinued: 2002
- Successor: Non-direct: IBM eServer zSeries; IBM eServer iSeries
- Related: S/390 Integrated Server

IBM S/390 Multiprise was a short-lived series of small, compact, entry-level mainframes.

== Multiprise 2000 ==
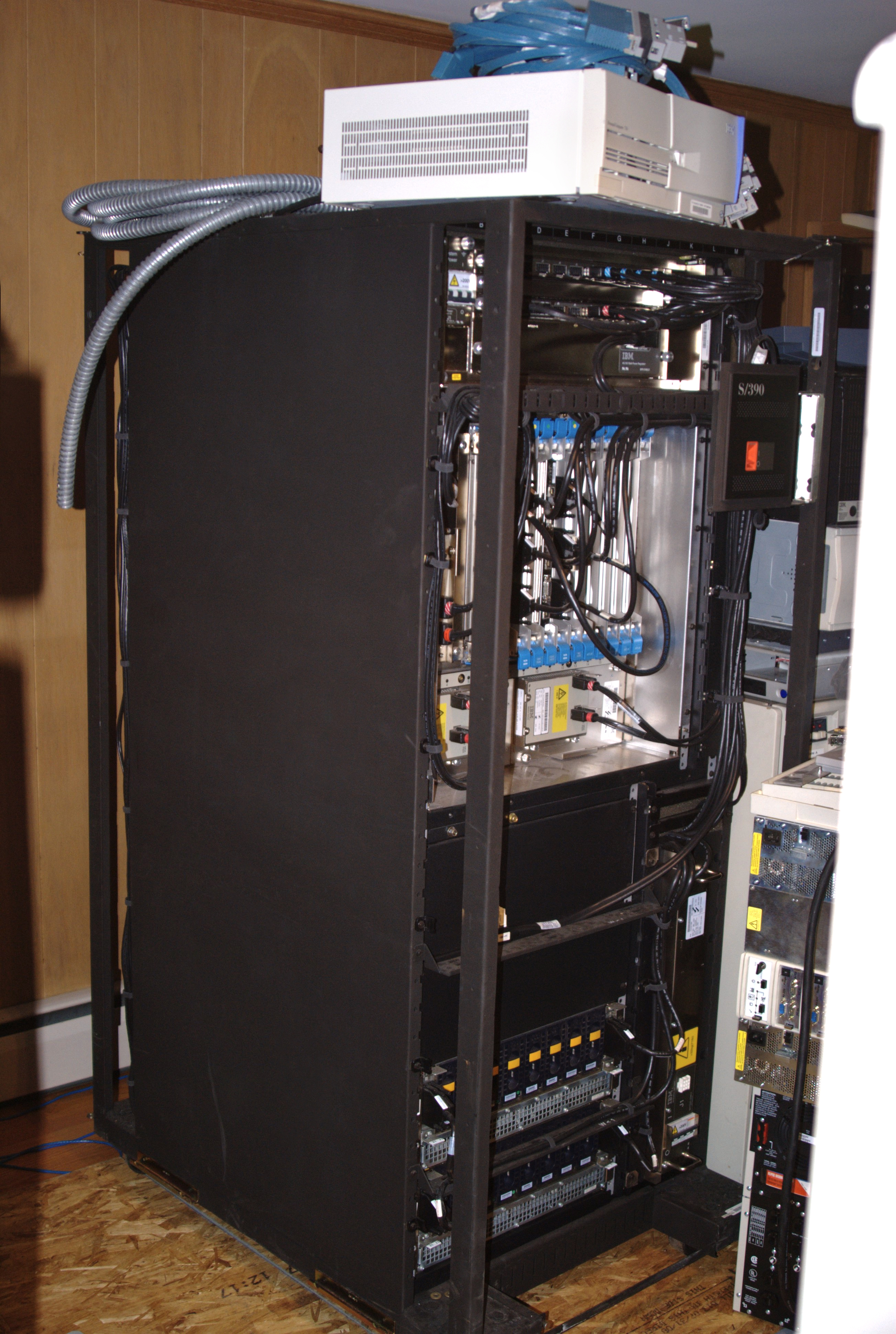
Internals of Multiprise 2000

The first model of the Multiprise series, the Multiprise 2000, was released in 1996 as a compact and affordable version of S/390 G3 mainframe.It used the same technology as the 9672 G3, but it fit half as many processors (up to five) and its off-chip caches were smaller. The 9672 G3 and the Multiprise 2000 were the last versions to support pre-XA System/370 mode. In October 1997 models of Multiprise 2000 with an 11% higher performance were launched.

== Multiprise 3000 ==
The Multiprise 3000 (product number 7060) was a compact mainframe measuring just 82 x 52 x 111 cm introduced in 1999. There were three models available (7060-H30, -H50, -H70), that differed in the capacity and throughput and, thus, in software license costs. Both H30/H50 had one main processor with 1GB/2GB of memory while the H70 model had two main processors with 4GB of memory. All models also had one System Assistance Processor (SAP). The main processors were the same CMOS chips used in the G5 series of IBM 9672, the flagship S/390 systems.

The Multiprise 3000 had ESCON channels and a limited number of network adapters for external I/O. It had a similar use case to that of the S/390 Integrated Server, which was introduced about one year earlier. The Multiprise 3000 was unusual in that it contained internal disk storage.

IBM also produced a 7060-H55 which was built on the 9672-R16 platform and a 7060-H75 which was built on the 9672-R26 platform. These machines are sometimes referred to as "the secret 7060". The 7060-H55 and 7060-H75 had OSA network adapter capabilities which allowed the network to talk across multiple LPARs. The 7060-H30, H50 and H70 were not OSA-capable and would require one network adapter per LPAR with a limit of four.

Models H50 and H70 were withdrawn from marketing in 2002. Withdrawal of service for all models occurred at the end of 2012.

The Multiprise 3000 was popular among smaller mainframe customers, particularly those running the 31-bit z/VSE V3R1 operating system. Initially supported OSes were OS/390 V2R4 through R8, VM/ESA V2R2 through R4, and VSE/ESA V2R2 through R4. (The 31-bit versions of TPF/ESA and VM/CMS are also compatible.) The 3000 could run subsequent OS releases, including all z/OS releases up to and including V1R5. However, the Multiprise 3000 rapidly lost popularity in the 21st century among z/OS and Linux/390 users because it did not implement the full z/Architecture architecture.

IBM's announcement that z/VSE V4R1, released in 2006, would require a z/Architecture system accelerated retirements of MP3000s given the system's popularity with VSE users. Multiprise 3000 users mostly upgraded to 64-bit models, starting with the System z9 BC, to run newer software such as DB2 Version 8 for z/OS. That migration has largely completed as of 2022, though anecdotally via mailing lists it appears that some shops still are running on what is now a completely unsupported system.

As of late 2006, the Multiprise 3000 was physically the smallest mainframe in common use, but modern IBM zSeries mainframes are more productive and energy efficient.

== See also ==
- z/TPF
- z/VM
- Information Management System
- List of IBM products
