= Open Systems Adapter =

The Open Systems Adapter (OSA) is a network controller for IBM z/Architecture, ES/9000 and S/390 mainframes. The OSA can be installed in a mainframe I/O cage. The OSA supports Ethernet, Token Ring and FDDI connectivity. The maximum data rate is 10 Gbps.
