= 3090 =

3090 most commonly refers to:

- 3090, a number in the 3000 (number) range
- A.D. 3090, a year of the 4th millennium CE
- 3090 BC, a year in the 4th millennium BCE

3090 may also refer to:

== Roads ==
- Hawaii Route 3090, a state highway, US
- Louisiana Highway 3090, a state highway, US
- Farm to Market Road 3090, a state highway in Texas, US
- A3090 road, in the UK

== Science and technology ==
- 3090 Tjossem, an asteroid in the Asteroid Belt, the 3090th asteroid registered
- IBM 3090, a mainframe computer
- Nvidia GeForce RTX 3090, a graphics card developed by Nvidia
