= IBM 303X =

Discontinued mainframe computer lineup by IBM

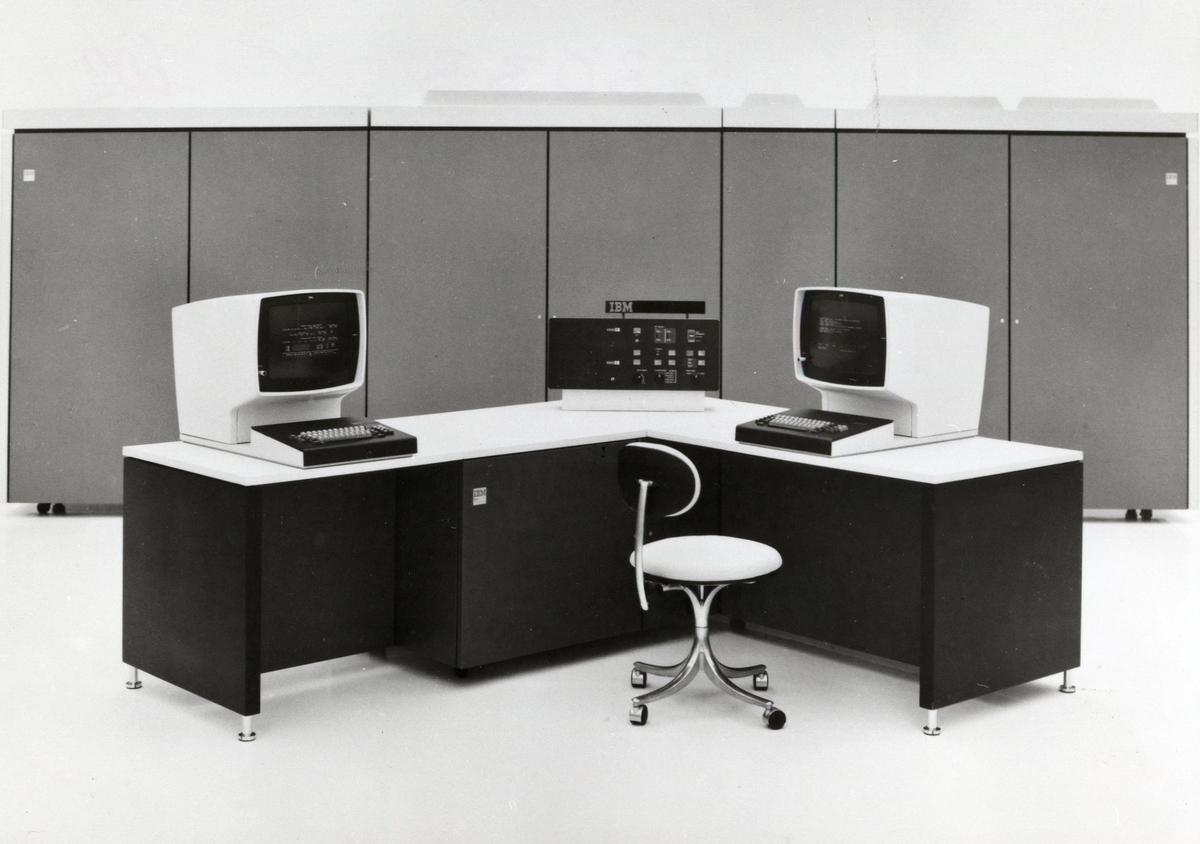
- IBM 3033 frame, 3036 console (table) and 3277 terminals
- Manufacturer: International Business Machines Corporation (IBM)
- Product family: IBM 3031; IBM 3032; IBM 3033
- Released: 1977
- Discontinued: February 5, 1985 (all three 303X)
- Successor: IBM 308X

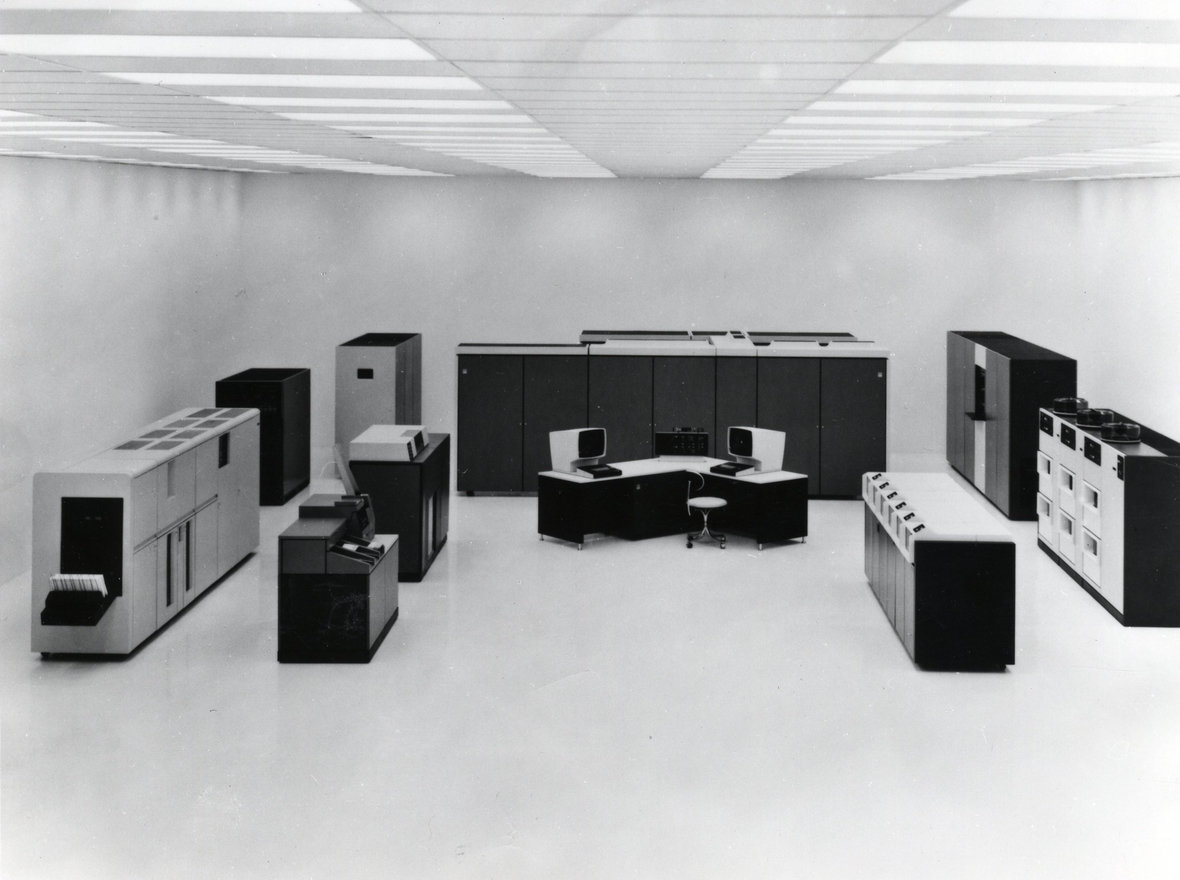
IBM 3033 and peripherals

The IBM 303X (Note: IBM used a capital X when referring to 303X, as did print media; see Computerworld ref below.) is a discontinued line of mainframe computers, the first model of which, the IBM 3033 Processor, nicknamed "The Big One", was announced March 25, 1977 with first shipments March 17, 1978.

Two additional processors, the 3031 and the 3032, were announced on October 6, 1977.

All three 303X systems were withdrawn on February 5, 1985.

== Features ==
The CPUs feature instruction pipelining, "several instructions can be pre-fetched while one is being executed". "Processor storage ... is four-way interleaved" resulting in "a significantly faster data rate than... non-interleaved". All three systems include a Dual-display console, the newly announced IBM 3036. The 3036 has an L-shaped desk, with two workstations. Each workstation has a service processor, a 3277 display, and two diskette drives (33FD). One diskette is used for logging hardware errors, and the other contains microcode. One of the service processors is the master, and the other is a backup; they can automatically switch roles when needed. The service processor is internally very similar to the service processor used in the IBM System/370 Model 158.

The systems consume less than half the floor space of a System/370 with an equal amount of computer memory and an identical number of channels because "the channels are physically integrated within the processor mainframe." All three machines have one or several dedicated I/O processors, called Channel Directors. A Channel Director is internally very similar to an IBM System/370 Model 158 CPU, running special channel microcode. Each Director has six channels attached, usually one byte multiplexor and five block multiplexor channels. The 3031 is air-cooled, while the two other processors are water-cooled. All three machine types use a 400 Hz power source. For the 3031 this is provided by a motor generator 3017, which is part of the processor complex; for the 3032 and 3033 an external 400 Hz power source is needed.

The initial announcement of the 3033 also introduced new operating system versions "MVS/System Extensions (Note: Google has several listings for "MVS/System Extensions" (plural), and none for the singular form) (MVS/SE) and VM/System Extensions (VM/SE)."

IBM reported in their April 1978 edition of Think magazine that the first three 303xs were shipped from their Poughkeepsie, N.Y., plant on 17 March 1978, listing the following customers:

- The Singer Company in Wayne, N.J was shipped a 3033
- The U.S. Air Force’s Data Services Center in Washington, D.C. was shipped a 3032
- The Credit Life Insurance Company in Springfield, Ohio was shipped a 3031

== 303X as successor to System 370 ==
Beginning in 1977, IBM began to introduce new systems, using the following descriptions:

- "A compatible member of the System/370 family."
- "System/370 Compatible - 303(1/2/3)"
- "the System/370 3033 Processor." (Note: or a similar reference, "S/370 3033-U" used by IBM in z/OS Performance: Managing Processor Storage in an all “Real” Environment)

=== Competing compatibles ===
At this time, other companies, known as plug compatible manufacturers (PCMs), were competing with IBM by producing IBM-compatible systems. By the late 1970s and early 1980s, patented technology allowed Amdahl IBM-compatible mainframes of this era to be completely air-cooled, unlike IBM systems that required chilled water and its supporting infrastructure— the eight largest of the 18 models of the ES/9000 systems introduced in 1990 were water-cooled; the other ten were air-cooled.

"The 3033 model, introduced in response to competition from the Amdahl Corporation, represented almost a 100 percent improvement in performance over the previous model, at only a 12 percent increase in price". The improvement in price–performance of the 303X models created volume of orders sufficient to cause a backlog. "The backlog backfired. IBM inadvertently gave Amdahl a huge boost when the results of its "delivery lottery" pushed some customer shipments all the way into 1980".

In October 1977, Computerworld reported that Itel's "air-cooled AS/6" was announced "within six hours of the IBM announcement" and due to ship "the same time deliveries of the IBM 3032 are slated to begin."

Magnuson Computer Systems also produced the M80 System/370-compatible computer system between 1975 and 1980.

== IBM 3031 ==
The 3031 features a machine cycle time of 115 nanoseconds (ns). It has a cache (called "high speed buffer storage" in IBM terminology) size of 32 KB. Main storage may be 2 to 6 MB, in 1 MB increments. It has one Channel Director, with one byte multiplexer and five block multiplexer channels. An optional channel-to-channel adapter (CTCA) is available. At announcement the monthly lease price for a minimally configured 3031 processor (2 MB, without peripherals) was $27,497. The 3031 is supported by MVS, OS/VS2 SVS, OS/VS1, VM/370, ACP, TSS/370, and DOS/VS, the last of which is not mentioned as supported by the other 303X models.

=== Models ===
The 3031 has 15 models, distinguished by the amount of main storage installed.

== IBM 3032 ==
The 3032 features a machine cycle time of 80 ns. It has a cache size of 32 KB. Main storage may be 2, 4, or 6 MB. One Channel Director is standard, with a second one available as an option. Usually each Director handles one byte multiplexer and five block multiplexer channels. Later on, the optional feature Data Streaming was added; it allowed the first block multiplexer channel in each Director to operate at 3 MB per second. An optional channel-to-channel adapter (CTCA) is available. At announcement the monthly lease price for a minimally configured 3032 processor (without peripherals) was $43,740. The 3032 is supported by MVS, OS/VS2 SVS, OS/VS1, VM/370, ACP, and TSS/370.

=== Models ===
The 3032 has four models, distinguished by the amount of main storage installed.

== IBM 3033 ==
The 3033 features a machine cycle time of 60 ns. It has a cache size of 64 KB. Initially the main storage was 4, 6, or 8 MB; later on this was expanded on some of the models to 8, 12 or 16 MB. Two Channel Directors are standard, with a third one available as an option. The third Director can only have four channels, because in 370 mode a system has max 16 channels. The third Director is available either with four block multiplexer channels or one byte multiplexer and three block multiplexers. Later on, the optional feature Data Streaming was added; it allowed the first block multiplexer channel in each Director to operate at 3 MB per second. Two optional channel-to-channel adapters (CTCA) are available. At announcement the monthly lease price for a minimally configured 3033 processor (without peripherals) was $70,400. The 3033 is supported by MVS, OS/VS2 SVS, OS/VS1, VM/370, and ACP.

The 3033-N, a slightly slower model, was introduced Nov. 1, 1979, and the 3033-S, with about 2/3 the speed of the original 3033 model, was introduced a year later, on November 12, 1980. The 3033-S was only equipped with one Channel Director, and the main storage was simplified and did not run in 4-way interleave mode. Each shipped the following quarter; both were withdrawn in 1985, along with the other 303X offerings.

The 3033 was later made available in attached-processor (AP) and multiprocessor (MP) dyadic configurations.

The 3033 AP configuration consisted of one 3033 and one 3042 interconnected. The first version of the 3042 did not have any channels, so all I/O operations had to be done from the 3033; the 3042 provided additional cpu power. Later versions (3042–2) did have one or two Channel Directors, thus enabling I/O operations. This also allowed the system to be partitioned into two parts, where one part could be temporarily down, for example, for maintenance, while still allowing the other part to continue to run.

The 3033 MP configuration consisted of two 3033 interconnected. Similar to the later 3033 AP, they could be partitioned into two parts, in example for running maintenance on one processor at a time. All 3033 AP and MP configurations includes two 3036 consoles.

=== Models ===
The 3033 had 29 models.

== Photos ==
- IBM 3032; note IBM 3036 Dual-display console, partial view of Univac 1108 on right side
- "IBM 3033 with users". IBM. Archived from the original on 19 November 2023.

== See also ==
- IBM System/360
- IBM System/370
- IBM 9370
