= IBM 9370 =

IBM mainframe-compatible low-end system

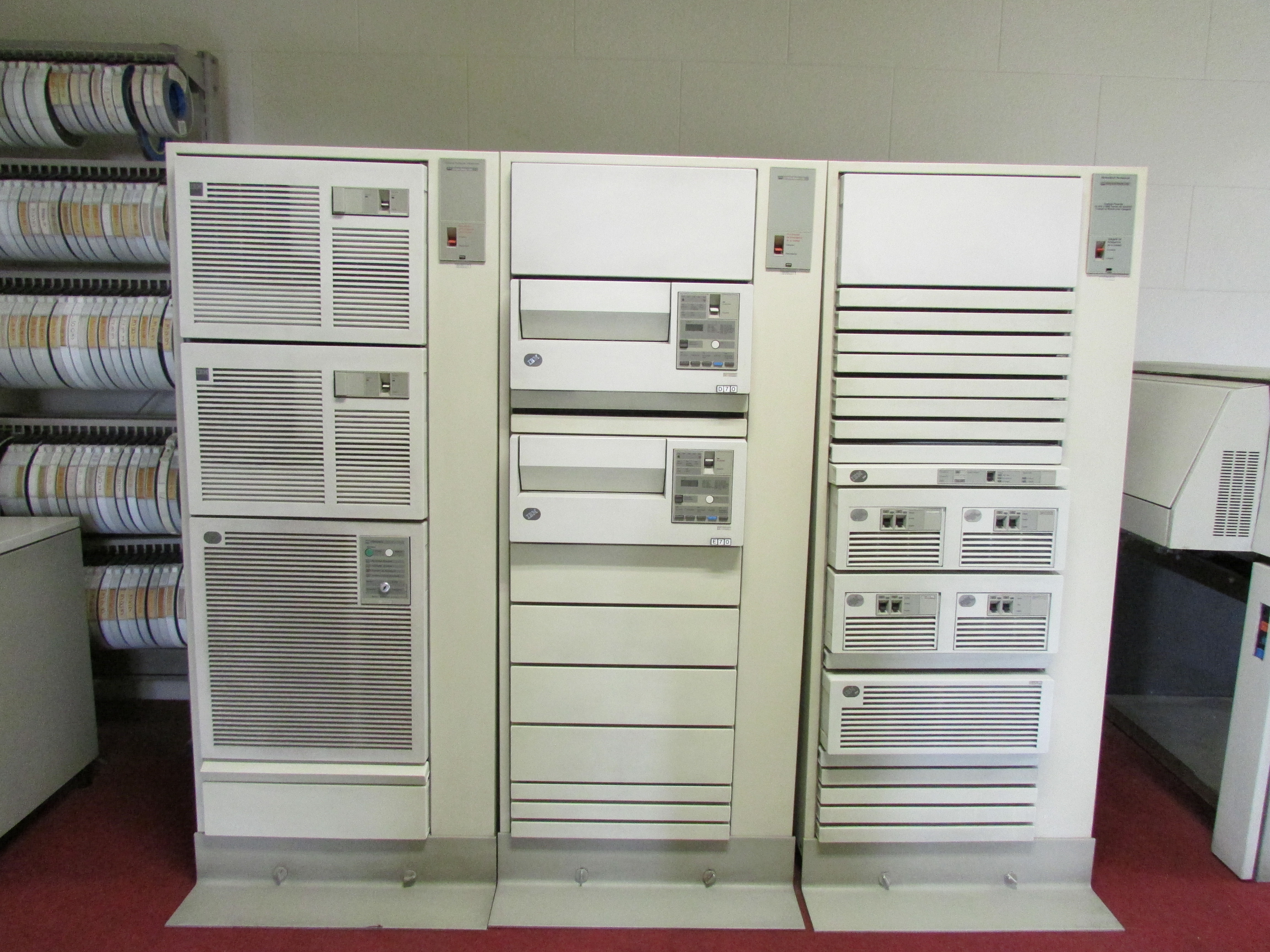
- The 9370 system - three IBM 9309 racks, equipped with: compute nodes; storage modules; network modules.
- Also known as: ES/9370
- Developer: IBM
- Released: 1986; 40 years ago
- Discontinued: 1989
- Operating system: MVS, VM, VSE, AIX/370, DPPX

The IBM 9370 systems are "baby mainframe" midrange computers, released 1986 at the very low end of, and compatible with System/370. The media of the day, referring to the VAX systems manufactured by Digital Equipment Corporation (DEC), carried IBM's alleged "VAX Killer" phrase, albeit often skeptically.

== History ==
The IBM 9370 was created in the aftermath of the failed Fort Knox project, which attempted to consolidate all of IBM's midrange systems into a single IBM 801-based hardware platform. The announcement described the IBM 9370 as a "super-mini computer" for commercial and engineering/scientific use—compact, rack-mounted, designed for an office environment, not needing a data center to be used.

At the time of announcement the systems were positioned between IBM's midrange systems (IBM System/36 and IBM System/38), and the IBM 4300 mainframe series in performance. The IBM 9370 was partially a replacement for the also-not-so-successful IBM 8100 distributed processing engine. High-level 9370 models were mentioned as a substitution when low-level 4300 models were withdrawn from marketing 1987.

Intended to be sold in large amounts as departmental machines ("VAX killers"), the 9370 initially suffered from lack of software and the failure of IBM to market it properly. Nevertheless, the systems were popular at least with users actually needing System/370 compatibility while not wanting to accept the expense of a larger system (like e.g. smaller software houses) or with users (like some large IBM customers) preferring hierarchically structured distributed processing solutions rigidly managed by central communication controllers like IBM 37xx. By 1990 the 9370 line had around 6,300 installed systems and generated over 2 billion dollars in sales for IBM. The relatively lacklustre commercial success of the 9370 served as an impetus for the creation of the much more successful AS/400 midrange systems.

While becoming part of the IBM Enterprise Systems Architecture in 1988 ("ES/9370" like "ES/4300" and "ES/3090"), the 9370s weren't XA systems. In 1990 IBM announced the "ES/9000" series; the rack-mounted models 120-170 with 31-bit Enterprise Systems Architecture (ESA) and ESCON were the suggested upgrades for ES/9370 users.

== Models and options ==
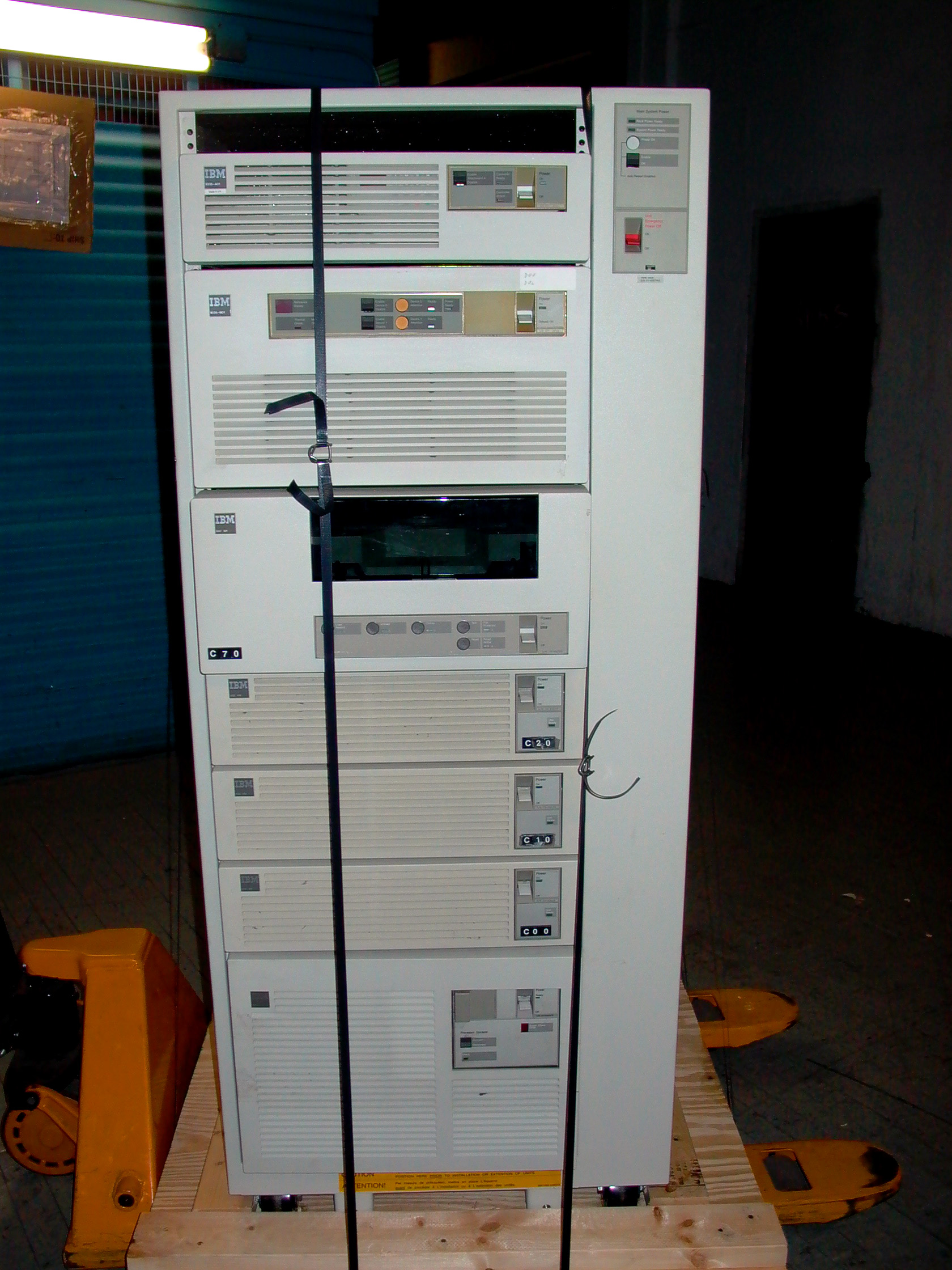
Single-rack 9375 system

=== Early models ===
Model	Model No.	Level	Memory (MB)	I/O card slots	DASD/Tape Controller	Workstation Controller	MVS/SP capability
20, 30	9373	low priced, entry level	4, 8, 16	7	1-2	2	no
40, 50, 55, 60	9375	mid-size	8, 16	17	1-4	2-4	larger Mod.60 only
80, 90	9377	highest (5x Mod.20)	8, 16	54	1-12	2-12	yes

The original 9370 hardware was based on technology created for the Fort Knox project - reusing some of the IBM 801-based processor design, and the SPD I/O bus which was derived from the Series/1 bus. All models included a floating-point accelerator as well as a processor console to install, operate and maintain the system. A militarized variant of the 9370 named the System/MIL-370 was announced alongside the original 9370 models, designed to operate in harsher environmental conditions than the standard 9370 hardware.

Each DASD/Tape Controller had eight device addresses and provided a data transfer rate of 3 MB. IBM 9332 (368 MB) and IBM 9335 (824 MB) DASD and IBM 9347 nine-track half-inch tape have been announced for the 9370s.

Each Workstation Controller could interface up to 32 IBM 3270 terminals / printers.

Software for all models included VM/SP+VM/IS, VSE/SP, and VM/SP+IX/370, while MVS/SP was only available for larger models.

=== Enterprise systems architecture models ===
An upgrade (Miscellaneous Equipment Specification, MES) was available which involved - among other things - replacing the 9332 FBA drives with CKD enabled DASDs.

In 1988, Distributed Processing Programming Executive DPPX/370 for ES/9370 was made available to customers wanting to migrate from the IBM 8100 running DPPX.

The "Micro Channel 370" Models 010, 012, 014 (later 110, 112, 114) ES/9371 introduced in 1990 used the Micro Channel bus and a 386 CPU for input/output (I/O) processing. Additionally, a dual-processor model was offered, providing a second 386 CPU for DOS and OS/2 applications, implementing a high-speed link between the processors. With the models mentioned, APPC support was added, using LU6.2 based on SNA PU2.1.

== See also ==
- Mainframe
- System/370
- IBM 4300
- IBM System/36 / IBM System/38
- IBM 7437
