= IBM 3090 =

Series of high-end 1980s IBM mainframe computers

- Manufacturer: International Business Machines Corporation (IBM)
- Product family: Models 120E, 150, 150E, 180, 180E, 200, 200E, 300, 300E, 400, 400E, 600E, 600J, 600S
- Predecessor: IBM 308X
- Successor: IBM ES/9000
- Website: Official website IBM Archives

The IBM 3090 family is a family of mainframe computers that was a high-end successor to the IBM System/370 series, and thus indirectly the successor to the IBM System/360 launched 25 years earlier.

Announced on 12 February 1985, the press releases did not explicitly mention that the two models, Model 200 and Model 400, were backwardly compatible with the 370; instead, they were simply positioned as replacements for the IBM 3033. The IBM 3090/200 version was rated at 18 MIPS and 31,000 UNIX Dhrystones. This was true of the entire line, which expanded with the release of the Model 120E, 150, 150E, 180, 180E, 200, 200E, 300, 300E, 400, 400E, 600E, 600J, and 600S 3090 were described as using "ideas from the ... IBM 3033, extending them ... It also took ... from the ... IBM 308X."

The 400 and 600 were respectively two 200s or 300s coupled together as one system and could run in either single-system image mode or partitioned into two systems.

== Models and features ==
Model	Announced	N-way/processor(s)
200	February 12, 1985	2 central processors
400	February 12, 1985	4-way (two 200s)
120E	May 19, 1987	Uniprocessor
150	February 11, 1986	Uniprocessor
150E	January 26, 1987	Uniprocessor
180	February 11, 1986	Uniprocessor
180E	January 26, 1987	Uniprocessor
200E	January 26, 1987	2 central processors
280E	January 26, 1987	2 central processors
300	1987	3-way (triadic)
300E	January 26, 1987	3-way (triadic)
400E	January 26, 1987	4-way (two 200Es)
600E	1987	6-way (two 300s)
280E	February 15, 1988	2-way (dyadic)
500E	February 15, 1988	5-way (200E+300E)
600S	1988	6-way (two 300s)
600J	1989	6-way (two 300s)

=== Cooling ===
By the late 1970s and early 1980s, patented technology allowed Amdahl mainframes of this era to be completely air-cooled, unlike IBM systems that required chilled water and its supporting infrastructure. The eight largest of the 18 models of the ES/9000 systems introduced in 1990 were water-cooled; the other ten were air-cooled.

=== Enterprise Systems Architecture/370 ===
On February 15, 1988, IBM announced Enterprise Systems Architecture/370 for 3090 enhanced ("E") models and for 4381 model groups 91E and 92E. In additional to the primary and secondary addressing modes that System/370 Extended Architecture (S/370-XA) supports, ESA has an AR mode in which each use of general register 1-15 as a base register uses an associated access register to select an address space. In addition to the normal address spaces that S/370-XA supports, ESA also allows data spaces, which contain no executable code.

=== Processor Resource/Systems Manager (PR/SM) ===
On February 15, 1988, IBM announced Processor Resource/Systems Manager (PR/SM) for 3090 enhanced ("E") models This feature allows the operator to define and assign resource to a virtual machine known as a logical partition (LPAR). Initially there was a 4-LPAR limit for uniprocessors and an 8-LPAR limit for multiprocessors, but newer machines support more.

=== Remote service capabilities ===
A modem for "remote service capabilities" was standard; IBM recommended their IBM 3864 model 2.

=== Vector facility ===
On October 1, 1985, IBM announced an optional vector facility for the IBM 3090; such a facility had not been previously available in the System/370 architecture, thus bringing integrated supercomputer capabilities to the mainframe line. IBM entered into partnerships with several universities to promote the use of the 3090 in scientific applications, and efforts were made to convert code traditionally run on Cray computers. Along with the vector unit, IBM introduced their Engineering and Scientific Subroutines Library and a facility to run programs written for the discontinued 3838 array processor.

== Photos ==
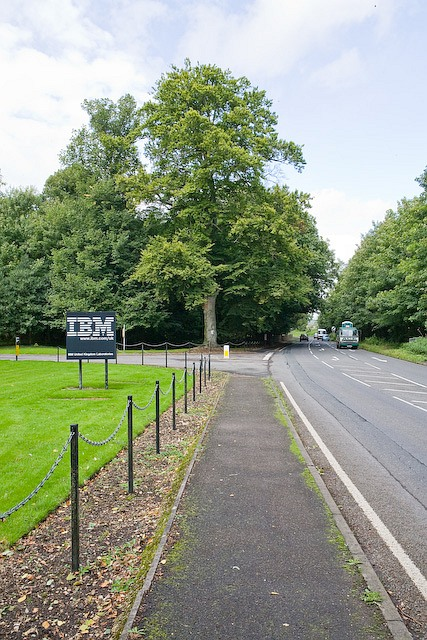
UK's A3090 (highway) leads to an access road for IBM's Hursley laboratory.

- IBM photo of 3090, facing operator console
- View of IBM 3090 600J system "box"

== See also ==
- IBM System/360
- IBM System/370
