= IBM Enterprise Systems Architecture =

IBM Enterprise Systems Architecture is an instruction set architecture introduced by IBM as Enterprise Systems Architecture/370 (ESA/370) in 1988. It is based on the IBM System/370-XA architecture.

It extended the dual-address-space mechanism introduced in later IBM System/370 models by adding a new mode in which general-purpose registers 1–15 are each associated with an access register referring to an address space, with instruction operands whose address is computed with a given general-purpose register as a base register will be in the address space referred to by the corresponding address register.

The later Enterprise Systems Architecture/390 (ESA/390), introduced in 1990, added a facility to allow device descriptions to be read using channel commands and, in later models, added instructions to perform IEEE 754 binary floating-point operations and increased the number of floating-point registers from 4 to 16.

Enterprise Systems Architecture is essentially a 32-bit architecture; as with System/360, System/370, and 370-XA, the general-purpose registers are 32 bits long, and the arithmetic instructions support 32-bit arithmetic. Only byte-addressable real memory (Central Storage) and Virtual Storage addressing is limited to 31 bits, as is the case with 370-XA. (IBM reserved the most significant bit to easily support applications expecting 24-bit addressing, as well as to sidestep a problem with extending two instructions to handle 32-bit unsigned addresses.) It maintains problem state backward compatibility dating back to 1964 with the 24-bit-address/32-bit-data (System/360 and System/370) and subsequent 24/31-bit-address/32-bit-data architecture (System/370-XA). However, the I/O subsystem is based on System/370 Extended Architecture (S/370-XA), not on the original S/370 I/O instructions.

== ESA/370 architecture ==
ESA/370
- Designer: IBM
- Bits: 32-bit
- Introduced: 1988; 38 years ago
- Design: CISC
- Type: Register–Register; Register–Memory; Memory–Memory
- Encoding: Variable (2, 4 or 6 bytes long)
- Branching: Condition code, indexing, counting
- Endianness: Big
- Predecessor: System/370-XA
- Successor: ESA/390

Registers
- General-purpose: 16× 32-bit
- Floating-point: 4× 64-bit

IBM S/370-ESA and S/390-ESA registers
General Registers 0–15
Two's complement value	
0	31
Access Registers 0–15
0	0	0	0	0	0	0	P	ALESN		ALEN	
0						6	7	8	15	16	31
ESA Access register abbreviations: Bits / Field / Meaning; 0–6 / / 0000000; 7 / P / Primary; 0=use dispatchable-unit access list 1=use primary-space access list; 8–15 / ALESN / access-list-entry sequence number; 16–31 / ALEN / access-list-entry number
Control Registers 0–15
See Principles of Operation or Control Registers	
0	31
Floating-Point Control (FPC) Register
Interrupt Masks (IM)								Status Flags (SF)								Data Exception Code (DXC)								Rounding Mode (RM)							
i	z	o	u	x	0	0	0	i	z	o	u	x	0	0	0	i	z	o	u	x	y	0	0	0	0	0	0	0	0	RM	
0	1	2	3	4	5		7	8	9	10	11	12	13		15	16	17	18	19	20	21	22	23	24					29	30	31
Floating-Point Registers (hexadecimal) 0–6/0–15 (Note: The number and format of floating-point registers depends on the installed features: ESA/370 ESA/390 without the new floating-point facilities Only the hexadecimal floating-point (HFP) registers FP0, FP2, FP4 and FP6 exist ESA/390 with the new floating-point facilities FP0-FP15 may be HFP or IEEE binary floating point)
S	Biased exponent		Mantissa	
0	1	7	8	31
Mantissa (continued)				
32				63
Floating-Point Registers (binary, single precision) 0–15 (Note: ESA/390 with the new floating-point facilities)
S	Biased exponent		Mantissa	
0	1	8	9	31
Floating-Point Registers (binary, double precision) 0–15 (Note: ESA/390 with the new floating-point facilities)
S	Biased exponent		Mantissa	
0	1	11	12	31
Mantissa (continued)				
32				63
Enterprise Systems Architecture Extended Control mode PSW
0	R	0	0	0	T	I O	E X	Key		1	M	W	P	AS		CC		Program; Mask		0	0	0	0	0	0	0	0
0	1	2		4	5	6	7	8	11	12	13	14	15	16	17	18	19	20	23	24							31
A	Instruction Address																										
32	33																										63
ESA EC mode PSW abbreviations: Bits / Field / Meaning; 1 / R / PER Mask; 5 / T / DAT mode; 6 / IO / I/O Mask; subject to channel mask in CR2; 7 / EX / External Mask; subject to external subclass mask in CR0; 8–11 / Key / PSW key; 12 / E=1 / Extended Control mode; 13 / M / Machine-check mask; 14 / W / Wait state; 15 / P / Problem state; 16–17 / AS / Address-Space Control; 00=primary-space mode 01=Access-register mode 10=Secondary-space mode 11=Home-space mode; 18–19 / CC / Condition Code; 20–23 / PM / Program Mask: Bit / Meaning; 20 / Fixed-point overflow; 21 / Decimal overflow; 22 / Exponent underflow (Note: Bit 22 is renamed as HFP exponent underflow in ESA/390); 23 / Significance (Note: Bit 23 is renamed as HFP significance in ESA/390); 32 / A / Addressing mode 0=24 bit; 1=31 bit; 33-63 / IA / Instruction Address

On February 15, 1988, IBM announced Enterprise Systems Architecture/370 (ESA/370) for 3090 enhanced ("E") models and for 4381 model groups 91E and 92E.

In addition to the primary-space and secondary-space addressing modes that later System/370 models, and System/370 Extended Architecture (S/370-XA) models, support, ESA has an access register mode in which each use of general register 1–15 as a base register uses an associated access register to select an address space. In addition to the normal address spaces that machines with the dual-address-space facility support, ESA also allows data spaces, which contain no executable code.

A machine may be divided into Logical Partitions (LPARs), each with its own virtual system memory so that multiple operating systems may run concurrently on one machine.

== ESA/390 architecture ==
ESA/390
- Designer: IBM
- Bits: 32-bit
- Introduced: 1990; 36 years ago
- Design: CISC
- Type: Register–Register; Register–Memory; Memory–Memory
- Encoding: Variable (2, 4 or 6 bytes long)
- Branching: Condition code, indexing, counting
- Endianness: Big
- Predecessor: ESA/370
- Successor: z/Architecture

Registers
- Access 16× 32, Control 16×32, Floating-Point Control (FPC) 32-bit, Prefix 32 bit, PSW 64-bit
- General-purpose: 16× 32-bit
- Floating-point: 4× 64-bit (hexadecimal) up to the G4; 16× 64-bit (hexadecimal and IEEE binary) starting with the G5

An important capability to form a Parallel Sysplex was added to the architecture in 1994.

ESA/390 also extends the Sense ID command to provide additional information about a device, and additional device-dependent channel commands, the command codes for which are provided in the Sense ID information, to allow device description information to be fetched from a device.

Starting with the System/390 G5, IBM introduced:

- the basic floating-point extensions facility, which increases the number of floating-point registers from 4 (0, 2, 4, 6) to 16 (0–15);
- the binary floating-point (BFP) extensions facility, which supports IEEE 754 binary floating-point numbers, with an additional floating-point control (FPC) register to support IEEE 754 modes and errors;
- the floating-point support (FPS) extensions facility, which adds instructions to load and store floating-point numbers regardless of whether they're in hexadecimal or IEEE 754 format and to convert between those formats;
- the hexadecimal floating-point (HFP) extensions facility, which adds new hexadecimal floating-point instructions corresponding to some binary floating-point instructions.

Some PC-based IBM-compatible mainframes which provide ESA/390 processors in smaller machines have been released over time, but are only intended for software development.

=== New facilities ===
ESA/390 adds the following facilities

All models
- Access-list-controlled protection

Some models
- Concurrent sense
- PER 2
- Storage-protection override
- Move-page facility 2
- Square root
- String instruction
- Suppression on protection with virtual-address enhancement
- Set address space control fast
- Subspace group
- Called-space identification
- Checksum
- Compare and move extended
- Immediate and relative instructions
- Branch and set authority
- Perform locked operation
- Additional floating-point
- Program call fast
- Resume program
- Trap
- Extended TOD clock
- TOD-clock-control override
- Store system information
- Extended translation 1
- Extended translation 2
- z/Architecture (certain instructions)
- Enhanced input/output

=== New instruction formats ===
Some of the ESA/390 facilities introduce new instruction formats. This includes the RI, RIL and RSI formats used for relative branches. The immediate field for relative branches is always signed and in units of a halfword.

=== New channel commands ===
The following channel commands (Note: The data returned by Sense ID include the command codes for Read configuration data, Read node identifier and Set interface identifier.) are new, or have their functionality changed, in ESA/390:

ESA/390 I/O-Device Commands
Command	Bit Position							
Command	0	1	2	3	4	5	6	7
Read configuration data	D	D	D	D	D	D	D	0
Read node identifier	D	D	D	D	D	D	D	0
Sense ID	1	1	1	0	0	1	0	0
Set interface identifier	D	D	D	D	D	D	D	1
Note: D Device dependent. The command code, if any, recognized by an I/O device may be obtained by using a sense-ID command.
