= Writeable control store =

Writeable control store may refer to

- Writable control store (WCS), memory used to load the operating system of the Amiga 1000
- Writable control store, memory used to store microprograms on machines where the microcode is reloadable
