= Core memory (disambiguation) =

Core memory or magnetic-core memory, is a form of random access computer memory used by computers in the mid-20th century.

Core Memory or core memory may also refer to:

- Core rope memory, a form of read-only computer memory first used in the 1960s
- Core memories, plot-critical items in the 2005 video game Star Fox Assault
- Core memories, plot-critical items in the 2015 animated film Inside Out
