= Albert Hopkins =

Albert Hopkins may refer to:

- Bert Hopkins (1874–1931), Australian cricketer
- Albert C. Hopkins (1837–1911), member of the U.S. House of Representatives from Pennsylvania
- Albert J. Hopkins (1846–1922), congressman and U.S. senator from Illinois
- Al Hopkins (1889–1932), American musician
- Albert L. Hopkins (1931–2016), computer scientist
- Albert Lloyd Hopkins (1871–1915), president of Newport News Shipbuilding who died in the sinking of the RMS Lusitania
