= Rmm =

RMM may refer to:

- Mali, license plate code
- Rameswaram railway station (Indian Railways station code), in Tamil Nadu, India
- Riverside Metropolitan Museum, in Riverside, California, United States (previously Riverside Municipal Museum)
- Read-mostly memory, a type of memory
- Relative molecular mass, another name for molecular mass, the atomic weight of a molecule or compound
- RMM Records & Video, a former Latin music record label
- Remote monitoring and management, supervising and controlling software systems
- Royal Meath Militia, Irish Militia regiment in County Meath
