= REPROM =

Reprogrammable memory (abbreviated as REPROM or RePROM) is type of ROM, more precisely, a type of PROM electronic memory. Re refers to reprogrammable ROM memory. There are two types of RePROM electronic memories:

- EPROM
- E²PROM or EEPROM

== See also ==
- Read-mostly memory (RMM)
