= Albert L. Hopkins =

American computer designer

Albert L. Hopkins Jr. (1931 - 2016) was an American computer designer. He worked at the US MIT Instrumentation Laboratory (now known as the Draper Lab) during the development of the Apollo Guidance, Navigation, and Control System, or the GN&C. The system was designed in two forms, one for the command module and one for the lunar module. The CM version included an optical system with an integrated scanning telescope and sextant for erecting and correcting the inertial platform. Albert Hopkins received a Ph.D. from Harvard University under Howard Aiken, he then joined the MIT Instrumentation Lab where he was Assistant Director; together with Ramon Alonso, and Hugh Blair-Smith he was a member of the group that designed the computer, designated AGC for Apollo Guidance Computer, identical in the CM and LM.

The AGC was a 15-bit plus parity machine with a 1 MHz clock. It was about one cubic foot in volume and weighed about 80 pounds. It used integrated circuit NOR gates, two to a package, but integrated RAM and ROM devices had not been developed yet. It had 2,000 words of magnetic ferrite core read-write memory and maybe 24 thousand words of read-only memory in the form of magnetic core ropes. These cores used metal tape magnetic cores. With such limited computing resources, the software had to be extremely tightly written in assembly code. These computers were designed with extremely long mean times to failure. Fifty were built by Raytheon, and none failed during several years of life. The human interface was a keyboard with ten digit keys and a few auxiliary keys for such things as "+" and "–" and "enter", and a display with three numbers of 5 decimal/octal digits, a two-digit program number, and a two-digit verb and a two-digit noun. The astronauts used it for all phases of command.

After leaving Draper Labs, Albert Hopkins, with his wife Lynne Zaccaria, opened a pottery and antiques shop in South Danbury, New Hampshire. Laterly they lived in Florida. He died on May 17, 2016. http://www.chadwickfuneralservice.com/fh/obituaries/obituary.cfm?o_id=3724138&fh_id=12966

== See also ==
- Charles Stark Draper
- Apollo program

== Bibliography ==
- The Apollo Guidance Computer (1963)
- A Multiprocessing Structure (1967)
