= Read–write memory =

Read–write memory, or RWM, is a type of computer memory that can be easily written to as well as read from using electrical signaling normally associated with running a software, and without any other physical processes. (Note: Unlike ROM or "read-only memory" and distinct from EEPROM.) The related storage type RAM means something different; it refers to memory that can access any memory location in a constant amount of time.

The term might also refer to memory locations having both read and write permissions. In modern computer systems using memory segmentation, each segment has a length and set of permissions (Note: For example, read, write, or execute) associated with it.

== Types ==
Read–write memory is composed of either volatile or non-volatile types of storage. Volatile memory is usually in the form of a microchip or other hardware that requires an external power source to enable data to persist. Non-volatile memory is considered static, or storage-type memory. This means that you can write data to it, and that information will persist even in the absence of a power source. Typically read-write speeds are limited to its bandwidth or have mechanical limitations of either rotation speeds and arm movement delays for storage types such as Cloud Storage, Hard Disk Drive or CD-RWs, DVD-RWs, SD cards, Solid-State Drive, SRAM, and DRAM, or other integrated circuitry.

== History ==
San Francisco in 1956, IBM was the first company to develop and sell the first commercial Hard Disk Drive (HDD). The drive was the Model 350 disk storage unit, which was 3.75 megabytes of data storage capacity and had fifty 24-inch diameter disks stacked on a spindle and sold to Zellerbach paper.

== See also ==
- Read-mostly memory (RMM)
- Random-access memory (RAM)
