= Read-only memory =

Form of non-volatile memory used in computers and other electronic devices

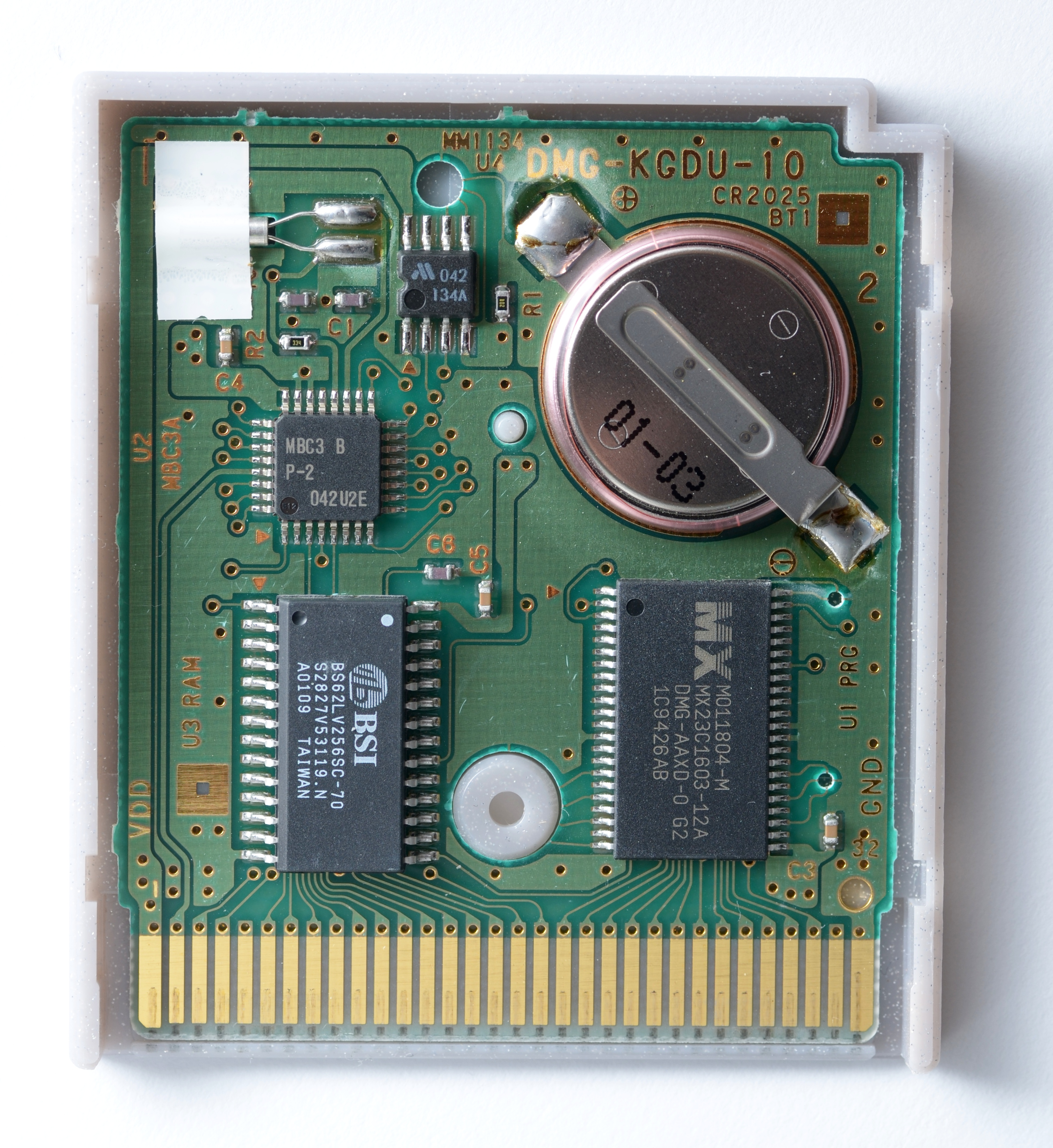
Many game consoles use interchangeable ROM cartridges, allowing for one system to play multiple games. Shown here is the inside of a Pokémon Silver Game Boy cartridge. The ROM is the IC on the right labeled "MX23C1603-12A".

Read-only memory (ROM) is a form of non-volatile memory used in computers and other electronic devices. Data stored in ROM cannot be electronically modified after the manufacture of the memory device. Read-only memory is useful for storing software that is rarely changed during the life of the system, also known as firmware. Software applications, such as video games, for programmable devices can be distributed as plug-in cartridges containing ROM.

Strictly speaking, read-only memory refers to hard-wired memory, such as diode matrix or a mask ROM integrated circuit (IC), that cannot be electronically changed after manufacture. Although discrete circuits can be altered in principle, through the addition of bodge wires and the removal or replacement of components, ICs cannot. Correction of errors, or updates to the software, require new devices to be manufactured and to replace the installed device.

Floating-gate ROM semiconductor memory in the form of erasable programmable read-only memory (EPROM), electrically erasable programmable read-only memory (EEPROM) and flash memory can be erased and re-programmed. But usually, this can only be done at relatively slow speeds, may require special equipment to achieve, and is typically only possible a certain number of times.

The term "ROM" is sometimes used to refer to a ROM device containing specific software or a file with software to be stored in a writable ROM device. For example, users modifying or replacing the Android operating system describe files containing a modified or replacement operating system as "custom ROM" after the type of storage the file used to be written to, and they may distinguish between ROM (where software and data is stored, usually flash memory) and RAM.

ROM and RAM are essential components of a computer, each serving distinct roles. RAM, or random access memory, is a temporary, volatile storage medium that loses data when the system powers down. In contrast, ROM, being non-volatile, preserves its data even after the computer is switched off.

== History ==
=== Discrete-component ROM ===
IBM used capacitor read-only storage (CROS) and transformer read-only storage (TROS) to store microcode for the smaller System/360 models, the 360/85, and the initial two System/370 models (370/155 and 370/165). On some models there was also a writeable control store (WCS) for additional diagnostics and emulation support. The Apollo Guidance Computer used core rope memory, programmed by threading wires through magnetic cores.

=== Solid-state ROM ===
The simplest type of solid-state ROM is as old as the semiconductor technology itself. Combinational logic gates can be joined manually to map n-bit address input onto arbitrary values of m-bit data output (a look-up table). With the invention of the integrated circuit came mask ROM. Mask ROM consists of a grid of word lines (the address input) and bit lines (the data output), selectively joined with transistor switches, and can represent an arbitrary look-up table with a regular physical layout and predictable propagation delay. Mask ROM is programmed with photomasks in photolithography during semiconductor manufacturing. The mask defines physical features or structures that will be removed, or added in the ROM chips, and the presence or absence of these features will represent either a 1 or a 0 bit, depending on the ROM design. Thus by design, any attempts to electronically change the data will fail, since the data is defined by the presence or absence of physical features or structures that cannot be electronically changed. For every software program, even for revisions of the same program, the entire mask must be changed, which can be costly.

In mask ROM, the data is physically encoded in the circuit, so it can only be programmed during fabrication. This leads to a number of serious disadvantages:

- It is only economical to buy mask ROM in large quantities, since users must contract with a foundry to produce a custom design for every piece, or revision of software.
- The turnaround time between completing the design for a mask ROM and receiving the finished product is long, for the same reason.
- Mask ROM is impractical for R&D work since designers frequently need to quickly modify the contents of memory as they refine a design.
- If a product is shipped with faulty mask ROM, the only way to fix it is to recall the product and physically replace the ROM in every unit shipped.

Subsequent developments have addressed these shortcomings. Programmable read-only memory (PROM), invented by Wen Tsing Chow in 1956, allowed users to program its contents exactly once by physically altering its structure with the application of high-voltage pulses. This addressed problems 1 and 2 above, since a company can simply order a large batch of fresh PROM chips and program them with the desired contents at its designers' convenience.

The advent of the metal–oxide–semiconductor field-effect transistor (MOSFET), invented at Bell Labs in 1959, enabled the practical use of metal–oxide–semiconductor (MOS) transistors as memory cell storage elements in semiconductor memory, a function previously served by magnetic cores in computer memory. In 1967, Dawon Kahng and Simon Sze of Bell Labs proposed that the floating gate of a MOS semiconductor device could be used for the cell of a reprogrammable ROM, which led to Dov Frohman of Intel inventing erasable programmable read-only memory (EPROM) in 1971. The 1971 invention of EPROM essentially solved problem 3, since EPROM (unlike PROM) can be repeatedly reset to its unprogrammed state by exposure to strong ultraviolet light.

Electrically erasable programmable read-only memory (EEPROM), developed by Yasuo Tarui, Yutaka Hayashi and Kiyoko Naga at the Electrotechnical Laboratory in 1972, went a long way to solving problem 4, since an EEPROM can be programmed in-place if the containing device provides a means to receive the program contents from an external source (for example, a personal computer via a serial cable). Flash memory, invented by Fujio Masuoka at Toshiba in the early 1980s and commercialized in the late 1980s, is a form of EEPROM that makes very efficient use of chip area and can be erased and reprogrammed thousands of times without damage. It permits erasure and programming of only a specific part of the device, instead of the entire device. This can be done at high speed, hence the name "flash".

All of these technologies improved the flexibility of ROM, but at a significant cost-per-chip, so that in large quantities mask ROM would remain an economical choice for many years. (Decreasing cost of reprogrammable devices had almost eliminated the market for mask ROM by the year 2000.) Rewriteable technologies were envisioned as replacements for mask ROM.

The most recent development is NAND flash, also invented at Toshiba. Its designers explicitly broke from past practice, stating plainly that "the aim of NAND flash is to replace hard disks," rather than the traditional use of ROM as a form of non-volatile primary storage. As of 2021, NAND has nearly completely achieved this goal by offering throughput higher than hard disks, lower latency, higher tolerance of physical shock, extreme miniaturization (in the form of USB flash drives and tiny microSD memory cards, for example), and much lower power consumption.

=== Use for storing programs ===
Many stored-program computers use a form of non-volatile storage (that is, storage that retains its data when power is removed) to store the initial program that runs when the computer is powered on or otherwise begins execution (a process known (Note: Other terms are used as well, e.g., "Initial Program Load" (IPL).) as bootstrapping, often abbreviated to "booting" or "booting up"). Likewise, every non-trivial computer needs some form of mutable memory to record changes in its state as it executes.

Forms of read-only memory were employed as non-volatile storage for programs in most early stored-program computers, such as ENIAC after 1948. (Until then it was not a stored-program computer as every program had to be manually wired into the machine, which could take days to weeks.) Read-only memory was simpler to implement since it needed only a mechanism to read stored values, and not to change them in-place, and thus could be implemented with very crude electromechanical devices (see historical examples below). With the advent of integrated circuits in the 1960s, both ROM and its mutable counterpart static RAM were implemented as arrays of transistors in silicon chips; however, a ROM memory cell could be implemented using fewer transistors than an SRAM memory cell, since the latter needs a latch (comprising 5-20 transistors) to retain its contents, while a ROM cell might consist of the absence (logical 0) or presence (logical 1) of one transistor connecting a bit line to a word line. Consequently, ROM could be implemented at a lower cost-per-bit than RAM for many years.

Most home computers of the 1980s stored a BASIC interpreter or operating system in ROM as other forms of non-volatile storage such as magnetic disk drives were too costly. For example, the Commodore 64 included 64 KB of RAM and 20 KB of ROM containing a BASIC interpreter and the KERNAL operating system. Later home or office computers such as the IBM PC XT often included magnetic disk drives, and larger amounts of RAM, allowing them to load their operating systems from disk into RAM, with only a minimal hardware initialization core and bootloader remaining in ROM (known as the BIOS in IBM-compatible computers). This arrangement allowed for a more complex and easily upgradeable operating system.

In modern PCs, "ROM" is used to store the basic bootstrapping firmware for the processor, as well as the various firmware needed to internally control self-contained devices such as graphic cards, hard disk drives, solid-state drives, optical disc drives, TFT screens, etc., in the system. Today, many of these "read-only" memories – especially the BIOS/UEFI – are often replaced with EEPROM or Flash memory (see below), to permit in-place reprogramming should the need for a firmware upgrade arise. However, simple and mature sub-systems (such as the keyboard or some communication controllers in the integrated circuits on the main board, for example) may employ mask ROM or OTP (one-time programmable).

ROM and successor technologies such as flash are prevalent in embedded systems. These are in everything from industrial robots to home appliances and consumer electronics (MP3 players, set-top boxes, etc.) all of which are designed for specific functions, but are based on general-purpose microprocessors. With software usually tightly coupled to hardware, program changes are rarely needed in such devices (which typically lack hard disks for reasons of cost, size, or power consumption). As of 2008, most products use Flash rather than mask ROM, and many provide some means for connecting to a PC for firmware updates; for example, a digital audio player might be updated to support a new file format. Some hobbyists have taken advantage of this flexibility to reprogram consumer products for new purposes; for example, the iPodLinux and OpenWrt projects have enabled users to run full-featured Linux distributions on their MP3 players and wireless routers, respectively.

ROM is also useful for binary storage of cryptographic data, as it makes them difficult to replace, which may be desirable in order to enhance information security.

=== Use for storing data ===
Since ROM (at least in hard-wired mask form) cannot be modified, it is only suitable for storing data which is not expected to need modification for the life of the device. To that end, ROM has been used in many computers to store look-up tables for the evaluation of mathematical and logical functions (for example, a floating-point unit might tabulate the sine function in order to facilitate faster computation). This was especially effective when CPUs were slow and ROM was cheap compared to RAM.

Notably, the display adapters of early personal computers stored tables of bitmapped font characters in ROM. This usually meant that the text display font could not be changed interactively. This was the case for both the CGA and MDA adapters available with the IBM PC (type 5150).

The use of ROM to store such small amounts of data has disappeared almost completely in modern general-purpose computers. However, NAND Flash has taken over a new role as a medium for mass storage or secondary storage of files.

== Types ==
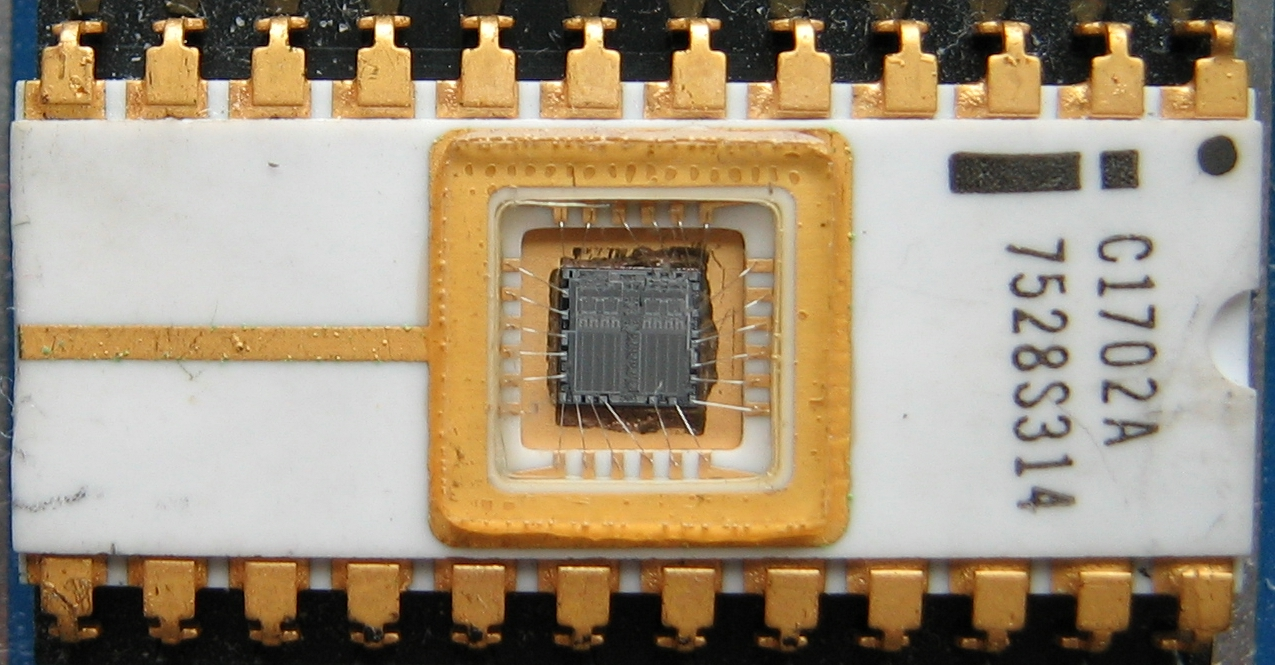
The first EPROM, an Intel 1702, with the die and wire bonds clearly visible through the erase window

=== Factory-programmed ===
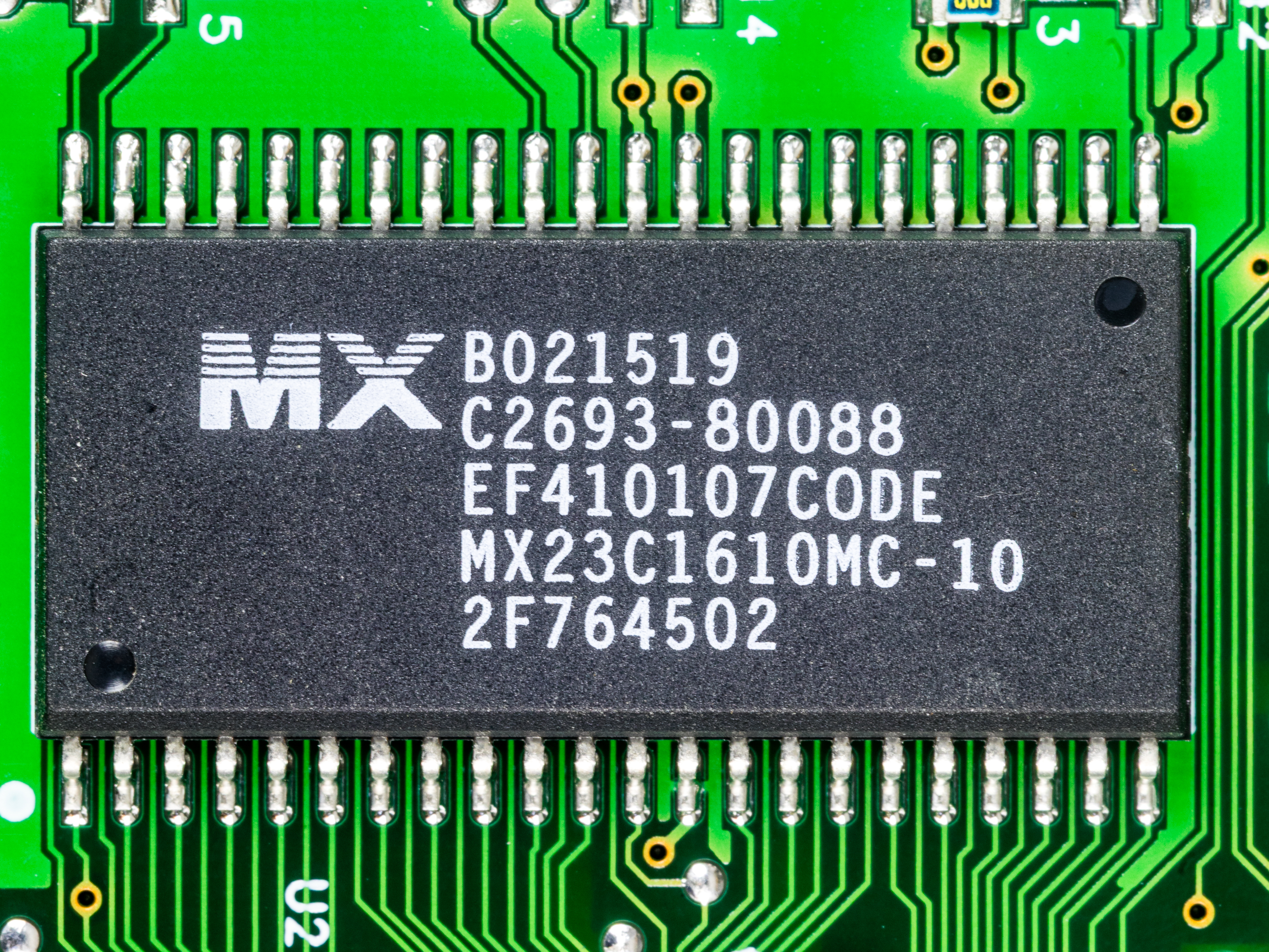
Macronix MX23C1610MC-10 - 5 Volt 16-Mbit (2M x 8 / 1M x 16) Mask ROM

Mask ROM is a read-only memory whose contents are programmed by the integrated circuit manufacturer (rather than by the user). The desired memory contents are furnished by the customer to the device manufacturer. The desired data is converted into a custom photomask/mask layer for the final metallization of interconnections on the memory chip (hence the name).

Mask ROM can be made in several ways, all of which aim to change the electrical response of a transistor when it is addressed on a grid, such as:

- In a ROM with transistors in a NOR configuration, using a photomask to define only specific areas of a grid with transistors, to fill with metal thus connecting to the grid only part of all the transistors in the ROM chip thus making a grid where transistors that are connected cause a different electrical response when addressed, than spaces in the grid where the transistors are not connected, a connected transistor may represent a 1 and an unconnected one a 0, or viceversa. This is the least expensive, and fastest way of making mask ROM as it only needs one mask with data, and has the lowest density of all mask ROM types as it is done at the metallization layer, whose features can be relatively large in respect to other parts of the ROM. This is known as contact-programmed ROM. In ROM with a NAND configuration, this is known as metal-layer programming and the mask defines where to fill the areas surrounding transistors with metal which short-circuits the transistors instead, a transistor that is not short circuited may represent a 0, and one that is may represent a 1, or viceversa.
- Using two masks to define two types of ion implantation regions for transistors, to change their electrical properties when addressed in a grid and define two types of transistors. The type of transistor defines if it represents a 1 or a 0 bit. One mask defines where to deposit one type of ion implantation (the "1" transistors), and another defines where to deposit the other (the "0" transistors). This is known as voltage threshold ROM (VTROM) as the different ion implantation types define different voltage thresholds in the transistors, and it's the voltage threshold on a transistor that defines a 0, or a 1. Can be used with NAND and NOR configurations. This technique offers a high level of resistance against optical reading of the contents as ion-implantation regions are difficult to distinguish optically, which may be attempted with decapping of the ROM and a microscope.
- Using two levels of thickness for a gate oxide in transistors, and using a mask to define where to deposit one thickness of oxide, and another mask to deposit the other. Depending on the thickness a transistor can have different electrical properties and thus represent either a 1 or a 0.
- Using several masks to define the presence or absence of the transistors themselves, on a grid. Addressing a non-existent transistor may be interpreted as a 0, and if a transistor is present it may be interpreted as a 1, or viceversa. This is known as active-layer programming.

Mask ROM transistors can be arranged in either NOR or NAND configurations and can achieve one of the smallest cell sizes possible as each bit is represented by only one transistor. NAND offers higher storage density than NOR. OR configurations are also possible, but compared to NOR it only connects transistors to V_{cc} instead of V_{ss}. Mask ROMs used to be the most inexpensive, and are the simplest semiconductor memory devices, with only one metal layer and one polysilicon layer, making it the type of semiconductor memory with the highest manufacturing yield (the highest number of working devices per manufacturing run). ROM can be made using one of several semiconductor device fabrication technologies such as CMOS, nMOS, pMOS, and bipolar transistors.

It is common practice to use rewritable non-volatile memory – such as UV-EPROM or EEPROM – for the development phase of a project, and to switch to mask ROM when the code has been finalized. For example, Atmel microcontrollers come in both EEPROM and mask ROM formats.

The main advantage of mask ROM is its cost. Per bit, mask ROM was more compact than any other kind of semiconductor memory. Since the cost of an integrated circuit strongly depends on its size, mask ROM is significantly cheaper than any other kind of semiconductor memory.

However, the one-time masking cost is high and there is a long turn-around time from design to product phase. Design errors are costly: if an error in the data or code is found, the mask ROM is useless and must be replaced in order to change the code or data.

As of 2003, four companies produce most such mask ROM chips: Samsung Electronics, NEC Corporation, Oki Electric Industry, and Macronix.

Some integrated circuits contain only mask ROM. Other integrated circuits contain mask ROM as well as a variety of other devices. In particular, many microprocessors have mask ROM to store their microcode. Some microcontrollers have mask ROM to store the bootloader or all of their firmware.

Classic mask-programmed ROM chips are integrated circuits that physically encode the data to be stored, and thus it is impossible to change their contents after fabrication.

It is also possible to write the contents of a Laser ROM by using a laser to alter the electrical properties of only some diodes on the ROM, or by using a laser to cut only some polysilicon links, instead of using a mask.

=== Field-programmable ===
- Programmable read-only memory (PROM), or one-time programmable ROM (OTP), can be written to or programmed via a special device called a PROM programmer. Typically, this device uses high voltages to permanently destroy or create internal links (fuses or antifuses) within the chip. Consequently, a PROM can only be programmed once.
- Erasable programmable read-only memory (EPROM) can be erased by exposure to strong ultraviolet light (typically for 10 minutes or longer), then rewritten with a process that again needs higher than usual voltage applied. Repeated exposure to UV light will eventually wear out an EPROM, but the endurance of most EPROM chips exceeds 1000 cycles of erasing and reprogramming. EPROM chip packages can often be identified by the prominent quartz "window" which allows UV light to enter. After programming, the window is typically covered with a label to prevent accidental erasure. Some EPROM chips are factory-erased before they are packaged, and include no window; these are effectively PROM.
- Electrically erasable programmable read-only memory (EEPROM) is based on a similar semiconductor structure to EPROM, but allows its entire contents (or selected banks) to be electrically erased, then rewritten electrically, so that they need not be removed from the computer (whether general-purpose or an embedded computer in a camera, MP3 player, etc.). Writing or flashing an EEPROM is much slower (milliseconds per bit) than reading from a ROM or writing to a RAM (nanoseconds in both cases).
  - Electrically alterable read-only memory (EAROM) is a type of EEPROM that can be modified one or a few bits at a time. Writing is a very slow process and again needs higher voltage (usually around 12 V) than is used for read access. EAROMs are intended for applications that require infrequent and only partial rewriting. EAROM may be used as non-volatile storage for critical system setup information; in many applications, EAROM has been supplanted by CMOS RAM supplied by mains power and backed up with a lithium battery.
  - Flash memory (or simply flash) is a modern type of EEPROM invented in 1984. Flash memory can be erased and rewritten faster than ordinary EEPROM, and newer designs feature very high endurance (exceeding 1,000,000 cycles). Modern NAND flash makes efficient use of silicon chip area, resulting in individual ICs with a capacity as high as 32 GB as of 2007; this feature, along with its endurance and physical durability, has allowed NAND flash to replace magnetic in some applications (such as USB flash drives). NOR flash memory is sometimes called flash ROM or flash EEPROM when used as a replacement for older ROM types, but not in applications that take advantage of its ability to be modified quickly and frequently.

By applying write protection, some types of reprogrammable ROMs may temporarily become read-only memory.

=== Other technologies ===
There are other types of non-volatile memory which are not based on solid-state IC technology, including:

- Optical storage media, such CD-ROM which is read-only (analogous to masked ROM). CD-R is Write Once Read Many (analogous to PROM), while CD-RW supports erase-rewrite cycles (analogous to EEPROM); both are designed for backwards-compatibility with CD-ROM.

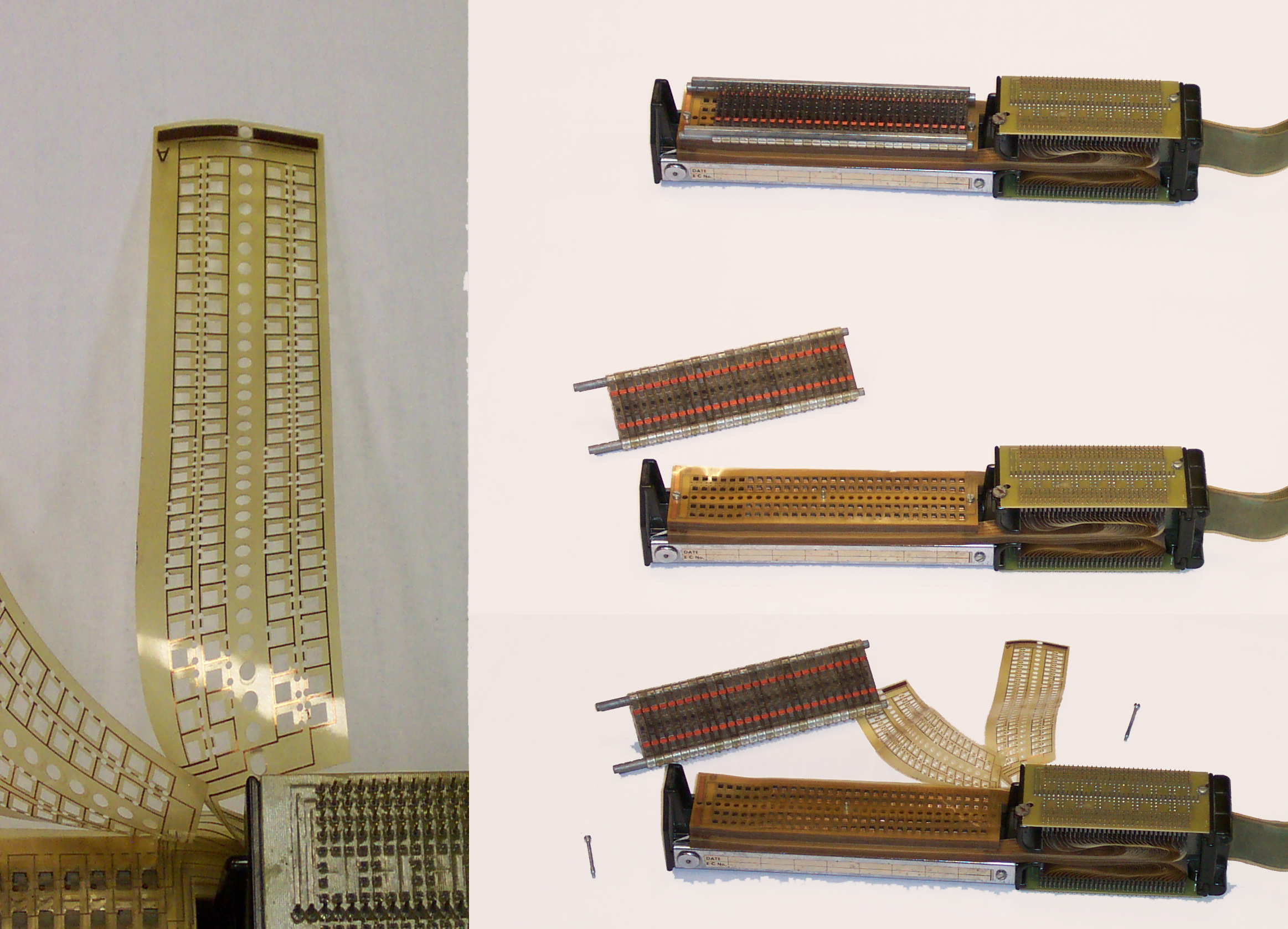
Transformer matrix ROM (TROS), from the IBM System 360/20

- Diode matrix ROM, used in small amounts in many computers in the 1960s as well as electronic desk calculators and keyboard encoders for terminals. This ROM was programmed by installing discrete semiconductor diodes at selected locations between a matrix of word line traces and bit line traces on a printed circuit board.
- Resistor or capacitor matrix ROM, used in many computers until the 1970s. Like diode matrix ROM, it was programmed by placing components at selected locations between a matrix of word lines and bit lines. ENIAC's Function Tables were resistor matrix ROM, programmed by manually setting rotary switches. Various models of the IBM System/360 and complex peripheral devices stored their microcode in a capacitor matrix, in variants called BCROS for balanced capacitor read-only storage on the 360/50 and 360/65, or CCROS for card capacitor read-only storage on the 360/30.
- Transformer matrix ROM achieves higher density storage than diode, resistor, or capacitor matrix ROMs, by using each matrix element to store multiple bits.
  - Dimond Ring Translator, named after Bell Labs inventor Thomas L. Dimond, in which wires are threaded through a sequence of large ferrite rings that function as transformers, coupling drive pulses to sense windings. Invented in the early 1940s, the Dimond Ring Translator was used in the #5 Crossbar Switch, and TXE telephone exchanges. Dimond Ring was the basis for most later forms of transformer-coupled or "core rope" memory.
  - Transformer Read Only Storage (TROS) on the 360/20, 360/40 and peripheral control units), is a transformer matrix ROM technology operating in the same way as the Dimond Ring Translator. It is faster and more compact than IBM's CCROS used in the IBM System/360 Model 30, but slower than IBM's BCROS used in the IBM System/360 Model 50 and Model 65.
  - Core rope memory, also known as wire braid memory, which couples drive lines to sense lines through ferrite cores, used where size, weight, and/or cost were critical. Core rope stores multiple bits of ROM per core (unlike normal read/write core memory), and was programmed by weaving "word line wires" inside or outside of ferrite transformer cores. Two different kinds of core rope memory, distinguished by whether the magnetization of the cores is flipped during operation, are known as the pulse-transformer technique and the switching-core technique
    - In the pulse-transformer technique, the drive lines are coupled to the sense lines through ferrite cores, but the core magnetization is not flipped, nor does this methoddepend on the magnetization hysteresis loop, using them only as transformers. This operates in the same way as the Dimond Ring Translator, and was used in DEC's PDP-9 and PDP-16 computers, the Hewlett-Packard 9100A and 9100B calculators, Wang calculators, and many other machines.
    - The switching-core technique does flip the magnetization of the ferrite cores. This is significantly different than the operation of a Dimond Ring Translator. This was used in NASA/MIT's Apollo Spacecraft Computers,
  - Inductively coupled printed circuit board memory, which uses inductive coupling but no ferrite cores, instead coupling between drive lines and sense lines on separate planes of a printed circuit board. This operates on the same principle as the Dimond Ring Translator, and was used in the Hewlett-Packard 9100A and 9100B calculators for the main control store (in addition to a pulse-transformer core rope memory used for the microinstruction decoder).

== Speed ==
Although the relative speed of RAM vs. ROM has varied over time, as of 2007 large RAM chips can be read faster than most ROMs. For this reason (and to allow uniform access), ROM content is sometimes copied to RAM or shadowed before its first use, and subsequently read from RAM.

=== Writing ===
For those types of ROM that can be electrically modified, writing speed has traditionally been much slower than reading speed, and it may need unusually high voltage, the movement of jumper plugs to apply write-enable signals, and special lock/unlock command codes. Modern NAND Flash can be used to achieve the highest write speeds of any rewritable ROM technology, with speeds as high as 10 GB/s in an SSD. This has been enabled by the increased investment in both consumer and enterprise solid-state drives and flash memory products for higher end mobile devices. On a technical level the gains have been achieved by increasing parallelism both in controller design and of storage, the use of large DRAM read/write caches and the implementation of memory cells which can store more than one bit (DLC, TLC and MLC). The latter approach is more failure prone but this has been largely mitigated by overprovisioning (the inclusion of spare capacity in a product which is visible only to the drive controller) and by increasingly sophisticated read/write algorithms in drive firmware.

== Endurance and data retention ==
An EPROM

Because they are written by forcing electrons through a layer of electrical insulation onto a floating transistor gate, rewriteable ROMs can withstand only a limited number of write and erase cycles before the insulation is permanently damaged. In the earliest EPROMs, this might occur after as few as 1,000 write cycles, while in modern Flash EEPROM the endurance may exceed 1,000,000. The limited endurance, as well as the higher cost per bit, means that Flash-based storage is unlikely to completely supplant magnetic disk drives in the near future.

The timespan over which a ROM remains accurately readable is not limited by write cycling. The data retention of EPROM, EAROM, EEPROM, and Flash may be time-limited by charge leaking from the floating gates of the memory cell transistors. Early generation EEPROM's, in the mid-1980s generally cited 5 or 6 year data retention. A review of EEPROM's offered in the year 2020 shows manufacturers citing 100 year data retention. Adverse environments will reduce the retention time (leakage is accelerated by high temperatures or radiation). Masked ROM and fuse/antifuse PROM do not suffer from this effect, as their data retention depends on physical rather than electrical permanence of the integrated circuit, although fuse re-growth was once a problem in some systems.

== Content images ==
The contents of ROM chips can be extracted with special hardware devices and relevant controlling software. This practice is common for, as a main example, reading the contents of older video game console cartridges. Another example is making backups of firmware/OS ROMs from older computers or other devices - for archival purposes, as in many cases, the original chips are PROMs and thus at risk of exceeding their usable data lifetime.

The resultant memory dump files are known as ROM images or abbreviated ROMs, and can be used to produce duplicate ROMs - for example to produce new cartridges or as digital files for playing in console emulators. The term ROM image originated when most console games were distributed on cartridges containing ROM chips, but achieved such widespread usage that it is still applied to images of newer games distributed on CD-ROMs or other optical media.

ROM images of commercial games, firmware, etc. usually contain copyrighted software. The unauthorized copying and distribution of copyrighted software is a violation of copyright laws in many jurisdictions, although duplication for backup purposes may be considered fair use depending on location. In any case, there is a thriving community engaged in the distribution and trading of such software for preservation/sharing purposes.

== Timeline ==
Date of introduction	Chip name	Capacity (bits)	ROM type	MOSFET	Manufacturer(s)	Process	Area	Ref
1956	?	?	PROM	?	Arma	?	?	
1965	?	256 bit	ROM	Bipolar TTL	Sylvania	?	?	
1965	?	1 kb	ROM	MOS	General Microelectronics	?	?	
1969	3301	1 kb	ROM	Bipolar	Intel	?	?	
1970	?	512 bit	PROM	Bipolar TTL	Radiation	?	?	
1971	1702	2 kb	EPROM	Static MOS (silicon gate)	Intel	?	15 mm^{2}	
1974	?	4 kb	ROM	MOS	AMD, General Instrument	?	?	
1974	?	?	EAROM	MNOS	General Instrument	?	?	
1975	2708	8 kb	EPROM	NMOS (FGMOS)	Intel	?	?	
1976	?	2 kb	EEPROM	MOS	Toshiba	?	?	
1977	μCOM-43 (PMOS)	16 kb	PROM	PMOS	NEC	?	?	
1977	2716	16 kb	EPROM	TTL	Intel	?	?	
1978	EA8316F	16 kb	ROM	NMOS	Electronic Arrays	?	436 mm^{2}	
1978	μCOM-43 (CMOS)	16 kb	PROM	CMOS	NEC	?	?	
1978	2732	32 kb	EPROM	NMOS (HMOS)	Intel	?	?	
1978	2364	64 kb	ROM	NMOS	Intel	?	?	
1980	?	16 kb	EEPROM	NMOS	Motorola	4,000 nm	?	
1981	2764	64 kb	EPROM	NMOS (HMOS II)	Intel	3,500 nm	?	
1982	?	32 kb	EEPROM	MOS	Motorola	?	?	
1982	27128	128 kb	EPROM	NMOS (HMOS II)	Intel	?	?	
1983	?	64 kb	EPROM	CMOS	Signetics	3,000 nm	?	
1983	27256	256 kb	EPROM	NMOS (HMOS)	Intel	?	?	
1983	?	256 kb	EPROM	CMOS	Fujitsu	?	?	
January 1984	MBM 2764	64 kb	EEPROM	NMOS	Fujitsu	?	528 mm^{2}	
1984	?	512 kb	EPROM	NMOS	AMD	1,700 nm	?	
1984	27512	512 kb	EPROM	NMOS (HMOS)	Intel	?	?	
1984	?	1 Mb	EPROM	CMOS	NEC	1,200 nm	?	
1987	?	4 Mb	EPROM	CMOS	Toshiba	800 nm	?	
1990	?	16 Mb	EPROM	CMOS	NEC	600 nm	?	
1993	?	8 Mb	MROM	CMOS	Hyundai	?	?	
1995	?	1 Mb	EEPROM	CMOS	Hitachi	?	?	
1995	?	16 Mb	MROM	CMOS	AKM, Hitachi	?	?	

== See also ==
- Flash memory
- Random-access memory
- Read-mostly memory (RMM)
- Write-only memory
