= Read-mostly memory =

Read-mostly memory (RMM) is a type of memory that can be read fast, but written to only slowly.

Historically, the term was used to refer to different types of memory over time:

In 1970, it was used by Intel and Energy Conversion Devices to refer to a new type of amorphous and crystalline nonvolatile and reprogrammable semiconductor memory (phase-change memory aka PCM/PRAM). However, it was also used to refer to reprogrammable memory (REPROM) and magnetic-core memory.

The term has mostly fallen into disuse, but is sometimes used referring to electrically erasable programmable read-only (EEPROM) or flash memory today.

== See also ==
- Read-only memory (ROM)
- Read–write memory (R/W)
- Programmable read-only memory (PROM)
- Random-access memory (RAM)
