= IBM System/360 Model 65 =

IBM computer model from 1960s

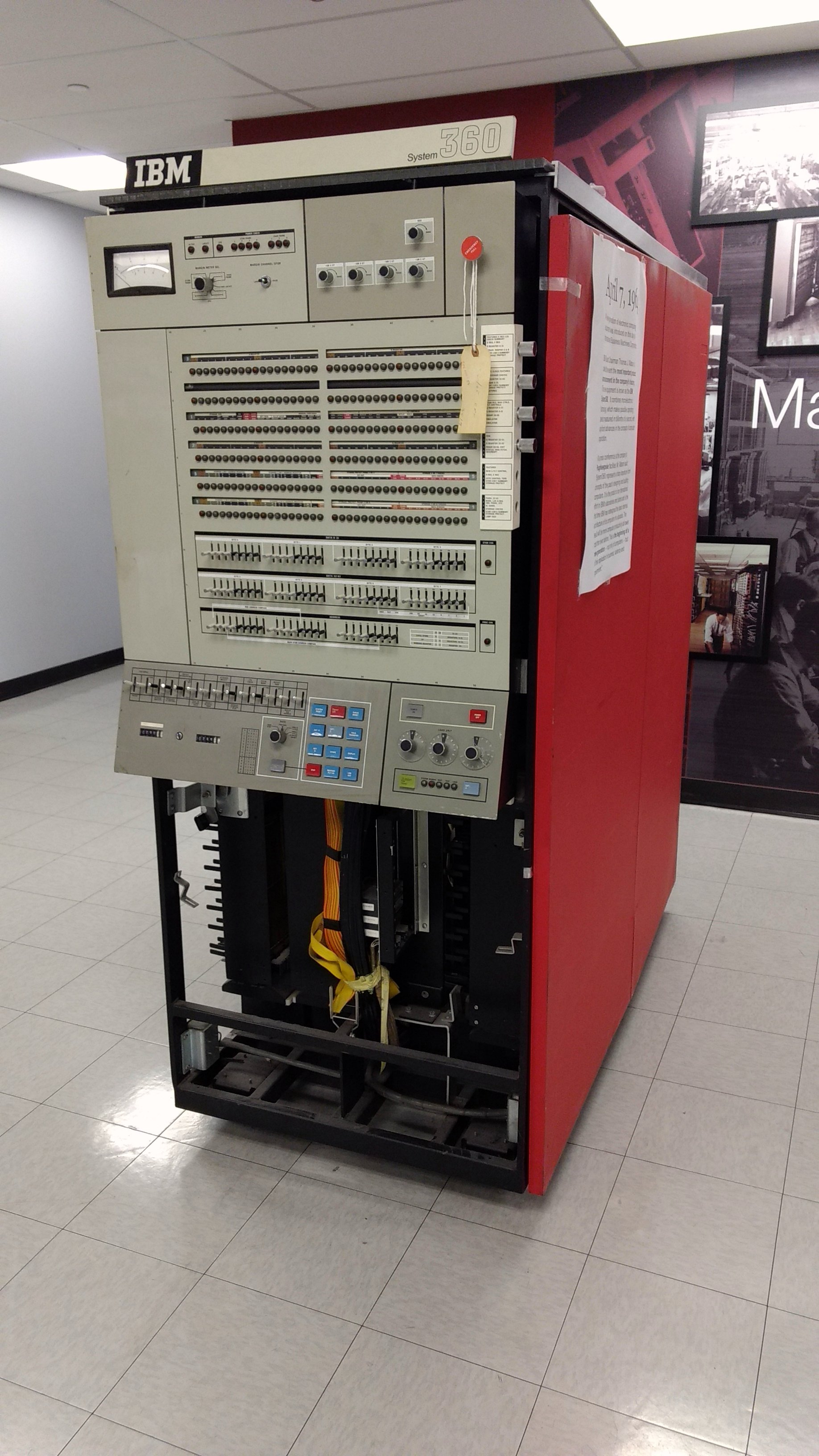
- IBM System/360 Model 65
- Manufacturer: International Business Machines Corporation (IBM)
- Product family: System/360
- Released: March 1965
- Discontinued: March 1974
- Memory: 128 KB–1 MB Core

The IBM System/360 Model 65 is a member of the IBM System/360 family of computers. It was announced April 1965, and replaced two models, the Model 60 and Model 62, announced one year prior but never shipped. It was discontinued in March 1974.

== Models ==
There are six submodels of the S/360-65. They vary by the amount of core memory with which the system is offered. The G65, H65, I65, IH65 and J65 submodels are configured with 128K, 256K, 512K, 768K or 1M of core memory, respectively. By 1974 the smallest G submodel had been discontinued. The MP (multiprocessor) model was added supporting from 512K to 2MB of system memory. The system can also attach IBM 2361 Large Capacity Storage (LCS) modules which provide up to 8MB of additional storage, however with a considerably slower memory cycle time of 8 microseconds compared to the 750 nanoseconds of processor storage.

The first model 65 was delivered to the Lincoln Laboratory in November 1965.

== Relative performance ==
The performance of the Model 65 is more than triple that of a S/360-50, whereas the Model 75, the next step up, was less than double that of a S/360-65.

== Features ==
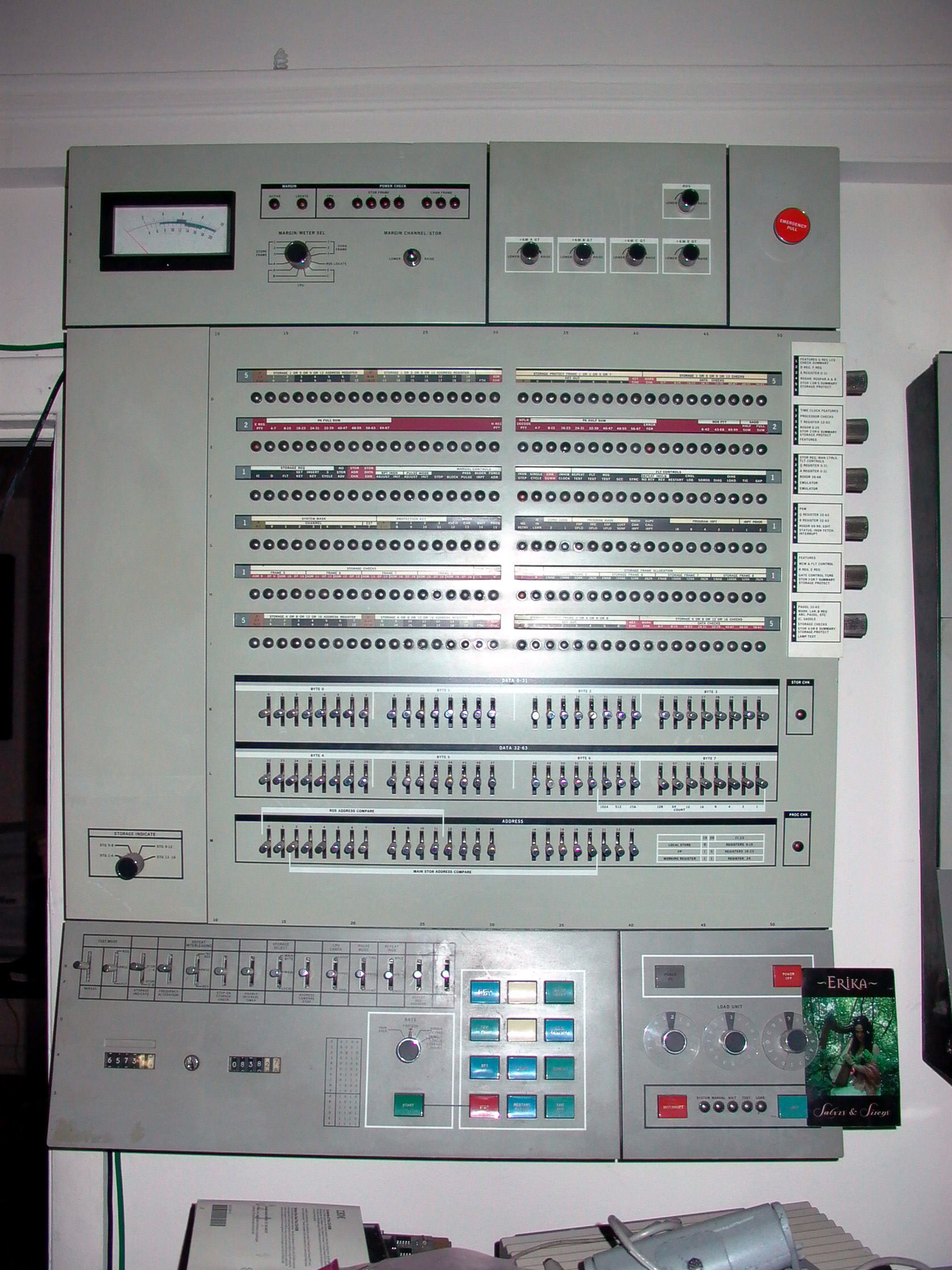
IBM System/360 Model 65 operators's console

The Model 65 implements the complete System/360 "universal instruction set" architecture, including floating-point, decimal, and character operations as standard features. It offers optional compatibility features to permit emulation of the IBM 7040 and 7044 and the IBM 7090 and 7094, the IBM 7070 and 7074, and the IBM 7080.

Main memory in the Model 65 can be interleaved for faster access.

The Model 65, like the Model 67, was available in a dual-CPU offering. Multi-processing (Dual-CPU) systems have two I65s, IH65s or J65s, and "the main storage of each processing unit is accessible to the other."

== Systems software ==
The Model 65 supports BPS, DOS/360, TOS/360, and OS/360 - PCP, MFT and MVT. MVT was a fairly typical choice of operating system for the Model 65.

A special version of MVT, called MP65, is needed for the multi-process (dual CPU) Model. MP65 uses special CPU-to-CPU/Multisystem mode instructions, such as Write Direct. The Model 65MP implements asymmetric multiprocessing: "certain input output equipment is accessible from only one processor."

Time-sharing can be provided on a Model 65 using IBM's Time Sharing Option (TSO).

== See also ==
- Smithsonian Institution – has a System/360 Model 65, though it is no longer on public display
