= IBM System/360 Model 40 =

IBM computer model from 1960s

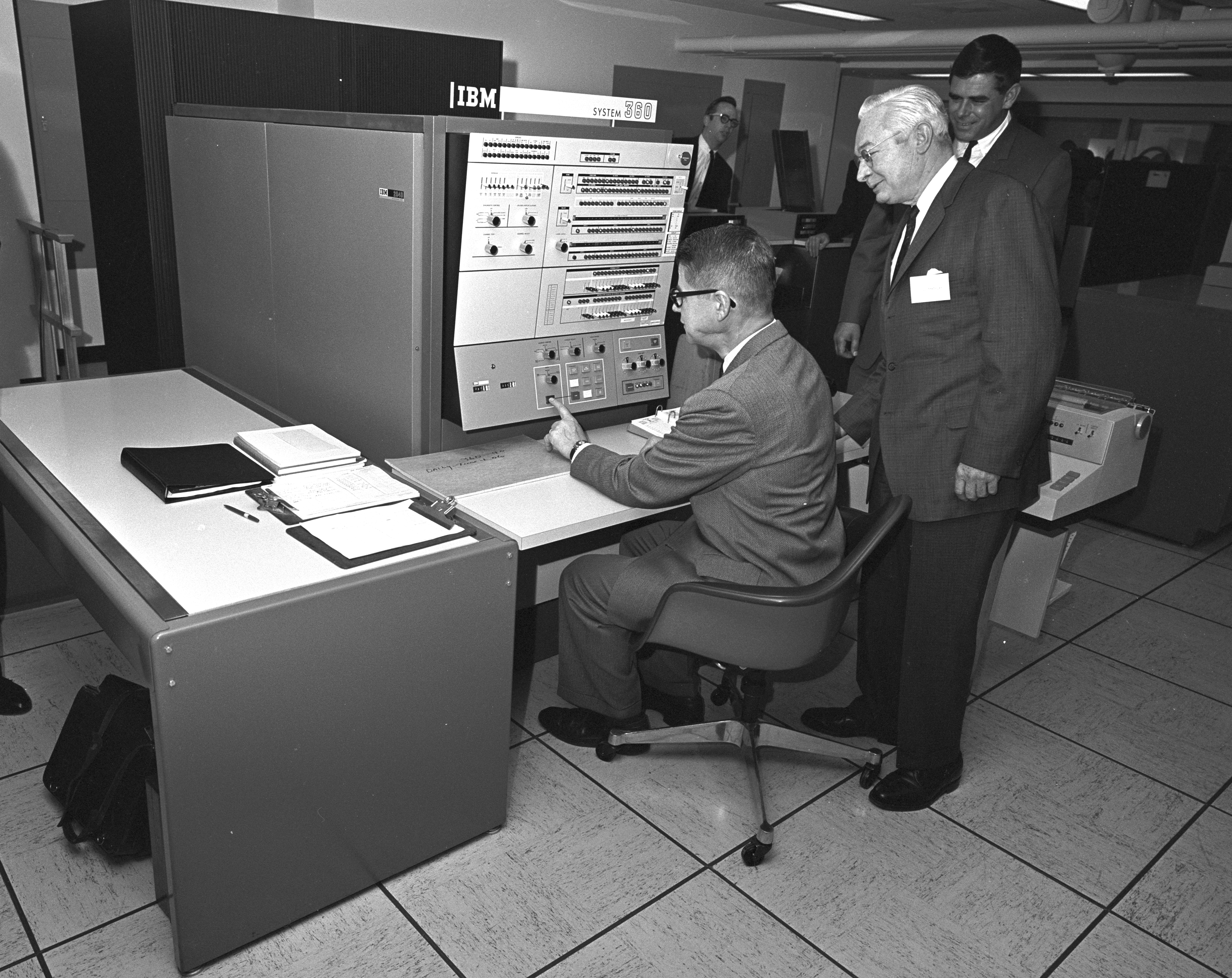
- IBM System/360 Model 40 at the USDA
- Manufacturer: International Business Machines Corporation (IBM)
- Product family: System/360
- Released: April 7, 1964
- Discontinued: October 7, 1977
- Memory: 16–128 KB Core

The IBM System/360 Model 40 is a mid-range member of the IBM System/360 family. It was announced on April 7, 1964, shipped in 1965, and withdrawn on October 7, 1977.

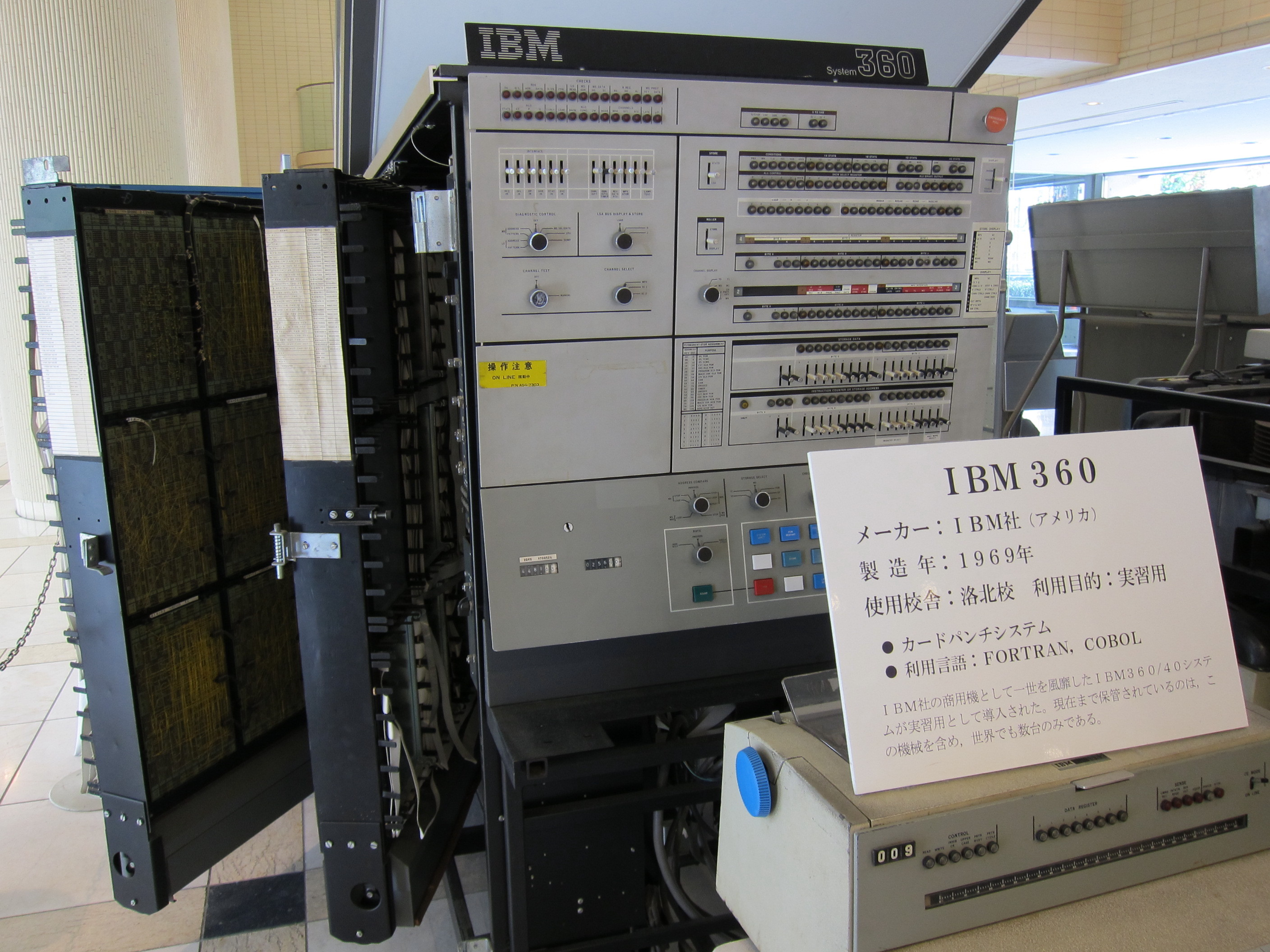
360/40 with circuit gates open

Control panel

== History ==
On April 7, 1964, IBM announced the IBM System/360, to be available in six models. The 360/40 was first delivered to Globe Exploration Company in April 1965.

The 360/30 and the 360/40 were the two largest revenue producing System/360 models, accounting for over half of the units sold.

== Models ==
Five models of the 360/40 were offered. The D40, E40, F40, G40 and H40 were configured with 16K, 32K, 64K, 128K and 256K of core memory and correspondingly 16, 32, 64, 128 and 128 (Note: not a typo: the physical limit seemed to be 224; see p. 17 of the Model 30 Functional Characteristics) multiplexer subchannels.

The H40 occupied "more floor space than the other models."

== Configuration ==
A typical, early, basic Model 40 system had the following configuration:
Model 40 processor	IBM 2040 Central Processing Unit; *128 KB byte storage *storage protection feature *universal instruction set *one multiplexor channel *two selector channels *interval timer
Operator console	IBM 1052 Typewriter-Keyboard (usually assigned to 009 hexadecimal address)
Unit record device	IBM 1442 Card Reader-Punch (00A) or IBM 2540 Reader-Punch (00C & 00D)
Line printer	IBM 1443 Printer (00B) or IBM 1403 Printer (00E)
Disk storage	IBM 2311 Magnetic Disk Drives (190 & 191) or IBM 2314 Direct Access Storage Facility
Tape storage	IBM 2401 Magnetic Tape Units (180 & 181 for 7-track, and 182 & 183 for 9-track)
Telecommunications controller (If used in a telecommunications environment)	IBM 2701 Communication Controller

== Microprogramming ==
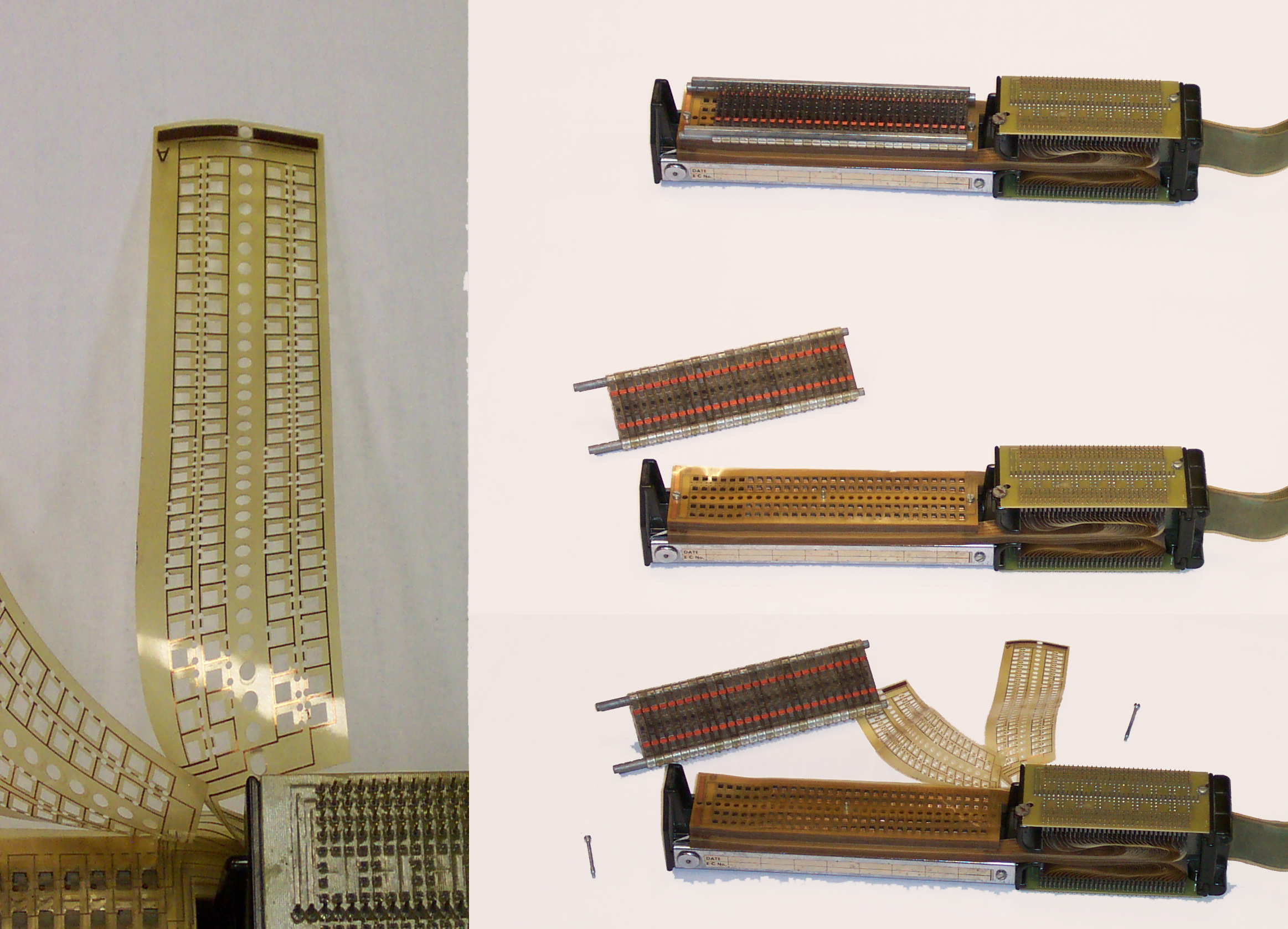
Transformer read-only storage (TROS), from the IBM System 360/40

Like most System/360 models, the Model 40 is microprogrammed. The microcode is stored in transformer read-only storage (TROS), organized as up to 8192 words of 56 bits each. Standard microcode consists of up to 4096 words. The additional 4096 words are used for the 1401 or 1410 compatibility feature.

== IBM 1400 series emulation ==
With the additional Compatibility Feature hardware and Compatibility Support software under DOS/360, the IBM 1401/1440/1460 object programs can be run in the emulation mode, with little or no reprogramming.

== Other ==
Although the cover of IBM's MVT Guide indicates that even a 360/40 could run MVT, the IBM operating system used was usually the realistically sized DOS/360, because all but one model of the 360/40 had less than MVT's minimum memory requirements of 256KB.

The IBM System/360 Model 40 was developed at IBM Hursley and manufactured at IBM's facilities in Poughkeepsie, New York, Mainz, Germany; and Fujisawa, Japan.

A modified Model 40 ran CP-40, the ancestor of CP/CMS, which in turn was the progenitor of the VM line.
