= IBM Hursley =

Laboratory in Hampshire, England

Coordinates: 51.02655°N 1.39870°W

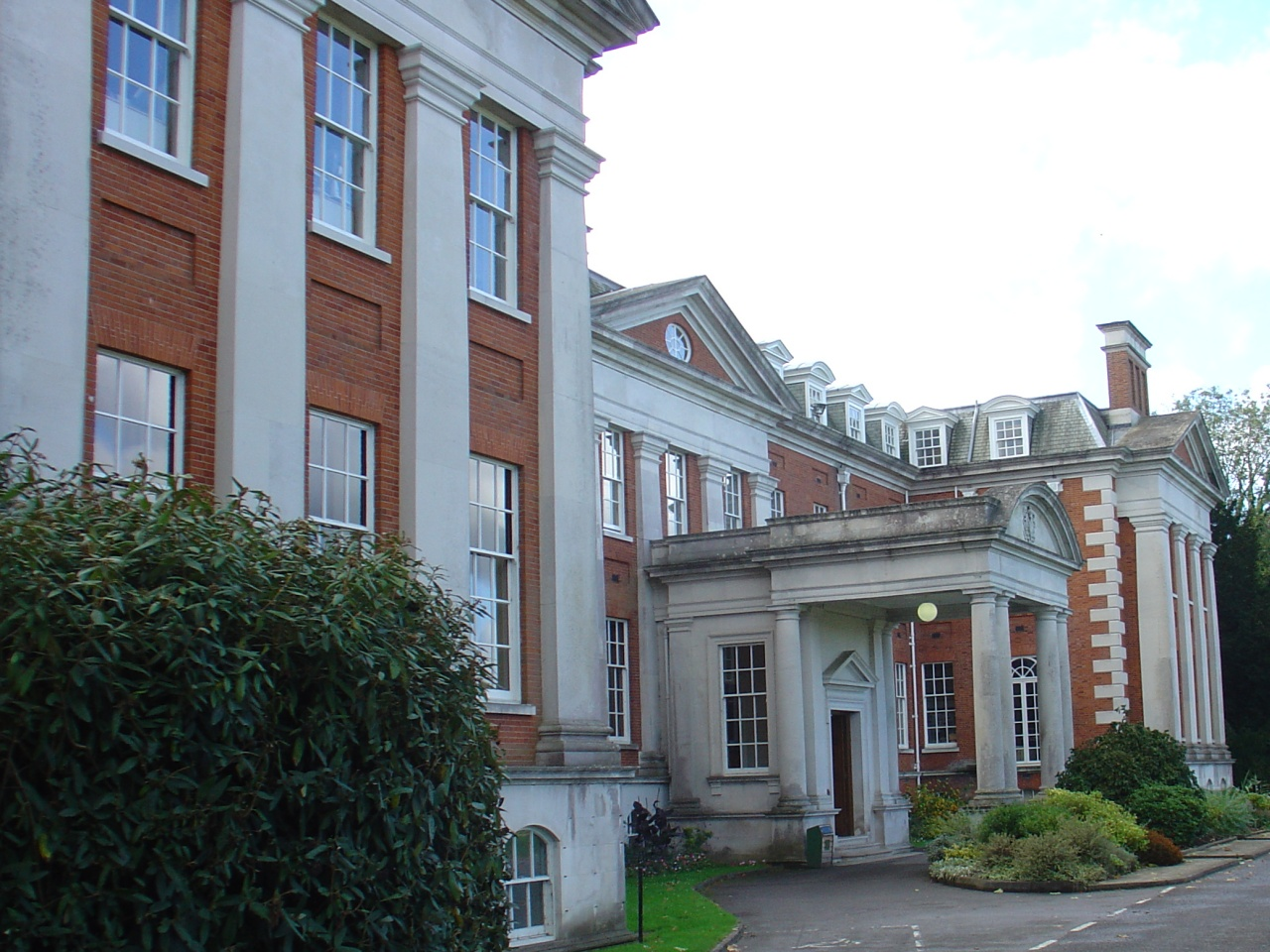
Hursley House

IBM Hursley is a research and development laboratory belonging to International Business Machines in the village of Hursley, Hampshire, England.

== History ==
Established in Hursley House, an 18th-century Queen Anne style mansion in 1958, the facility has been instrumental in the development of IBM's software technologies since the 1950s. It is still the home of development for CICS and MQ technology. Among the software developed by IBM Hursley is the Customer Information Control System (CICS), used in ATMs, which was the first Hursley product with a billion dollars in annual revenue.

Initially, IBM just used the House and its grounds. In 1963 it purchased 100 acres (405,000 m^{2}) of land surrounding the house and has since erected a large modern office complex employing over 1500 people.

The facility is host to the IBM Client Centre, which offers potential clients a secure environment where they can test company software and work with staff experts on best practices, proof of concept, and proof of technology.

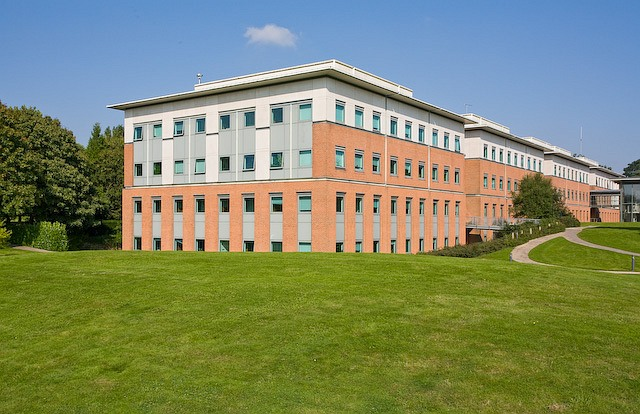
"A" block, one of several modern buildings added to the Hursley estate by IBM

Hursley House itself, a Grade II* listed building, is still used as an Executive Briefing Centre. The lower ground floor of the house is home to the IBM Hursley Museum, a computing museum that covers the history of IBM Hursley Park, IBM United Kingdom, and IBM Corporation.
