= IBM System/360 =

IBM computer family (1964–1977)

System/360

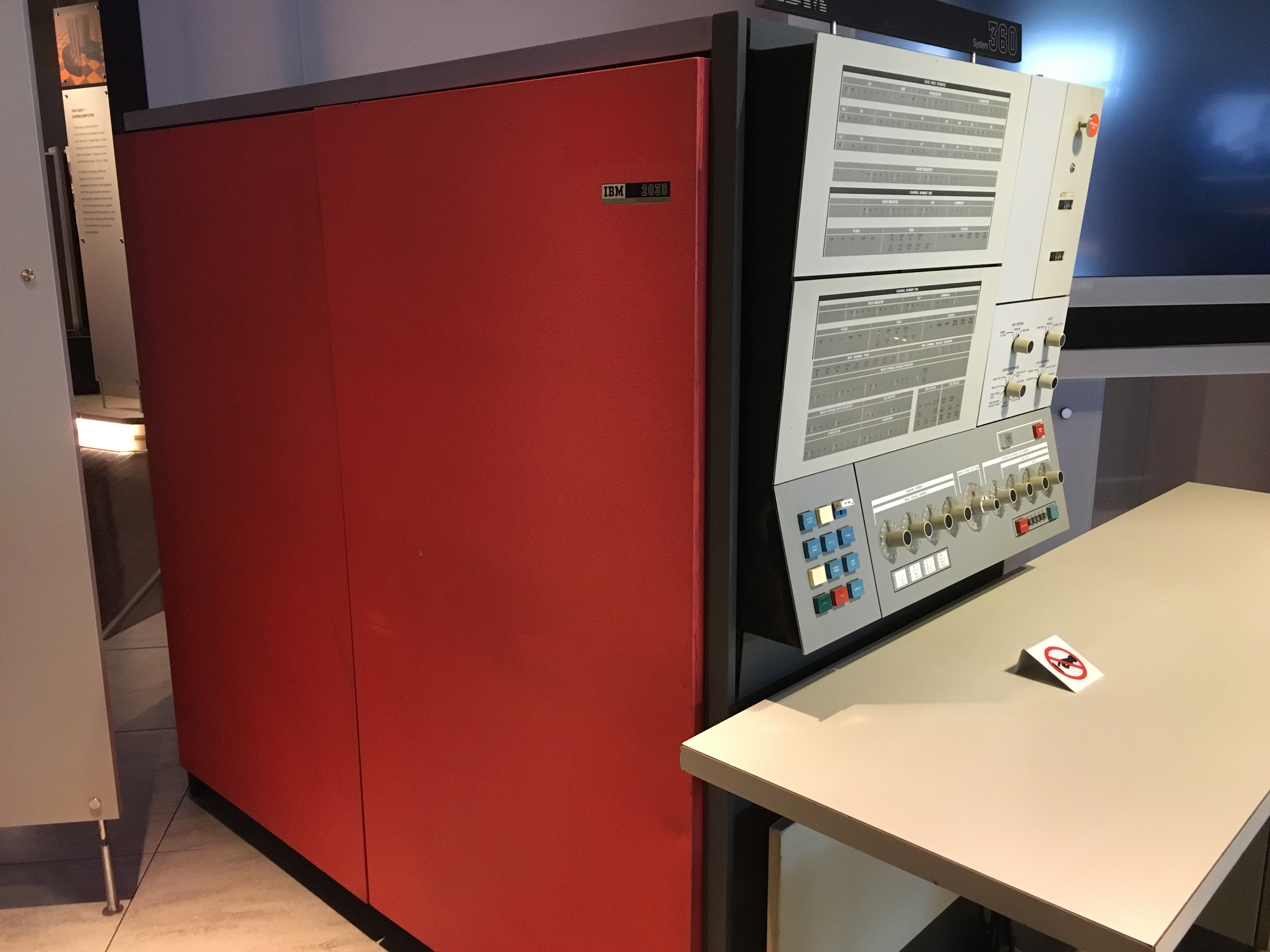
- IBM System/360 Model 30 central processor unit (CPU)
- Also known as: S/360
- Developer: IBM
- Manufacturer: IBM
- Product family: See table of models
- Type: Mainframe computer
- Released: April 7, 1964; 62 years ago
- Discontinued: 1978; 48 years ago
- Media: tape; DASDs; paper tape; printed paper; punched cards
- Operating system: BOS/360; TOS/360; DOS/360; OS/360; TSS/360
- Memory: 8 KB – 9 MB (core memory) (thin-film memory on the Model 95))
- Predecessor: 700/7000 series, 1400 series
- Successor: System/370
- Related: System/360 architecture

The IBM System/360 (S/360) is a family of computer systems announced by IBM on April 7, 1964, and delivered between 1965 and 1978. System/360 was the first family of computers designed to cover both commercial and scientific applications and a complete range of sizes from small, entry-level machines to large mainframes. The design distinguished between architecture and implementation, allowing IBM to release a suite of compatible designs at different prices. All but the only partially compatible Model 44 and the most expensive systems use microcode to implement the instruction set, which used 8-bit byte addressing with fixed-point binary, fixed-point decimal and hexadecimal floating-point calculations. The System/360 family introduced IBM's Solid Logic Technology (SLT), which packed more transistors onto a circuit card, allowing more powerful but smaller computers, but did not include integrated circuits, which IBM considered too immature.

System/360's chief architect was Gene Amdahl and the project was managed by Fred Brooks, responsible to Chairman Thomas J. Watson Jr. The commercial release was piloted by another of Watson's lieutenants, John R. Opel, who managed the launch of IBM's System/360 mainframe family in 1964. The slowest System/360 model announced in 1964, the Model 30, could perform up to 34,500 instructions per second, with memory from 8 to 64 KB. High-performance models came later. The 1967 IBM System/360 Model 91 could execute up to 16.6 million instructions per second. The larger 360 models could have up to 8 MB of main memory, though that much memory was unusual; a large installation might have as little as 256 KB of main storage, but 512 KB, 768 KB or 1024 KB was more common. Up to 8 megabytes of slower (8 microsecond) Large Capacity Storage (LCS) was also available for some models.

The IBM 360 was extremely successful, allowing customers to purchase a smaller system knowing they could expand it, if their needs grew, without reprogramming application software or replacing peripheral devices. It influenced computer design for years to come; many consider it one of history's most successful computers. Application-level compatibility (with some restrictions) for System/360 software is maintained to the present day with the IBM Z mainframe servers.

== System/360 history ==
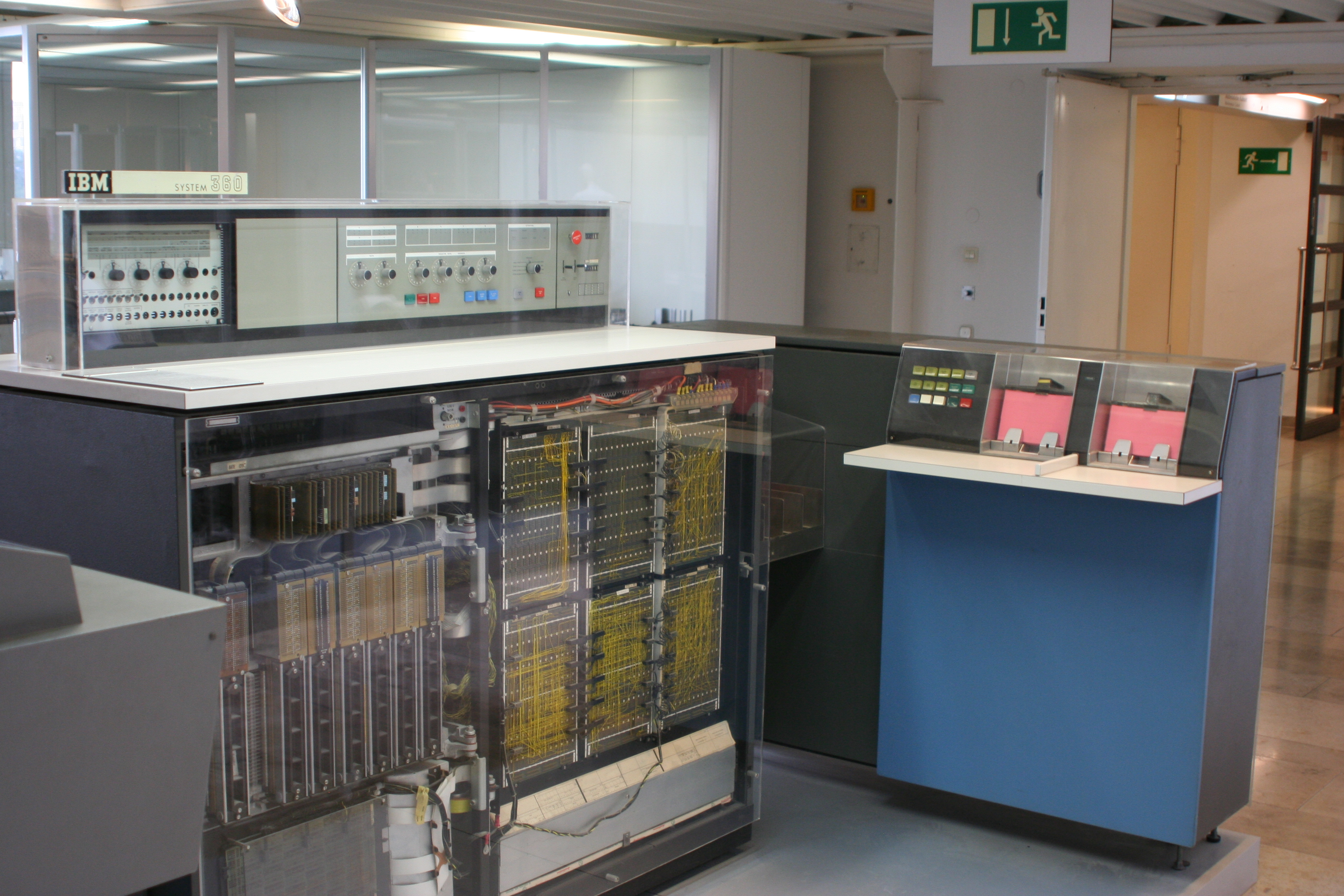
IBM System/360 Model 20 CPU with front panels removed, with IBM 2560 MFCM (Multi-Function Card Machine)

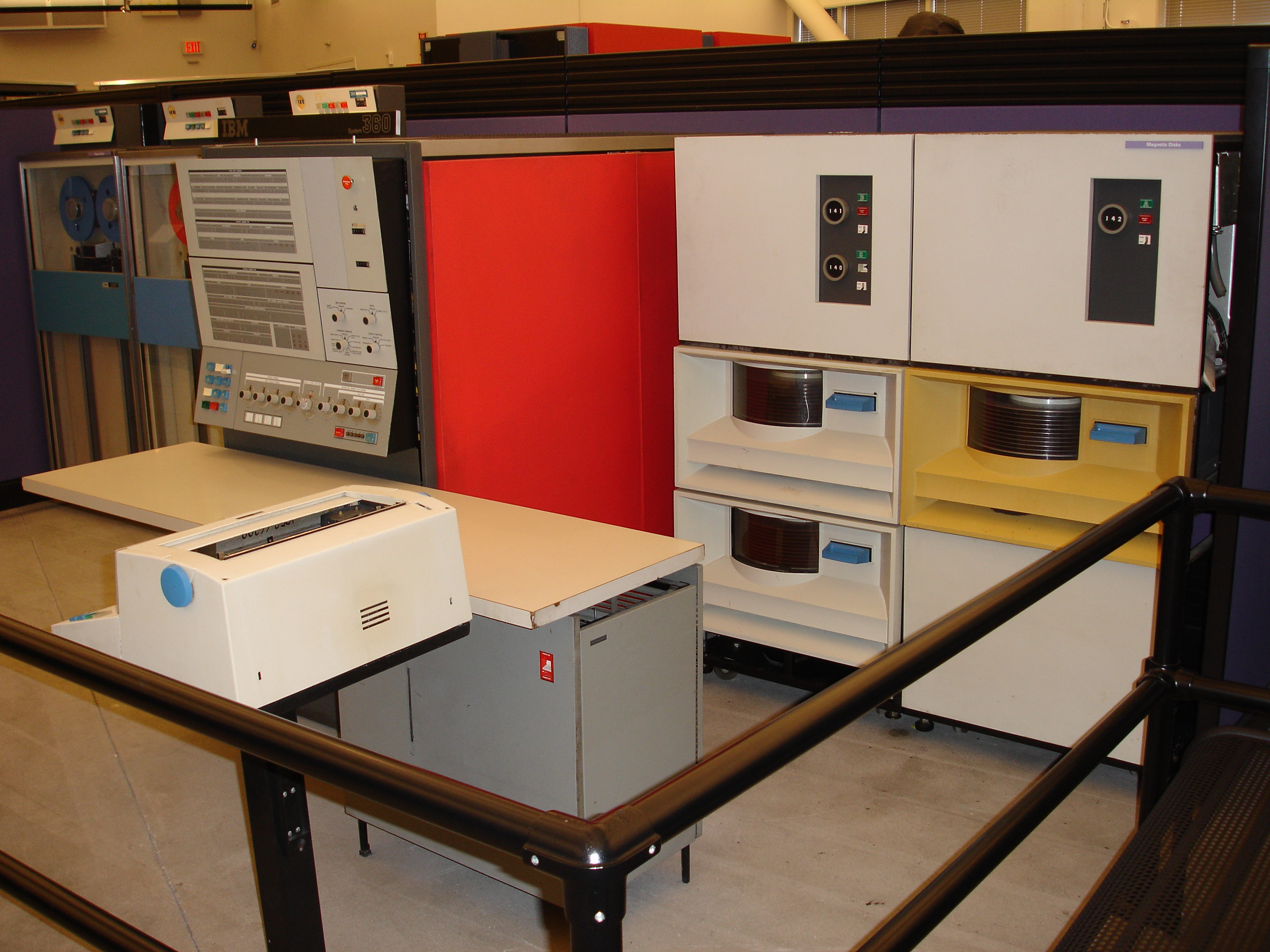
IBM System/360 Model 30 CPU (red, middle of picture), tape drives to its left, and disk drives to its right, at the Computer History Museum

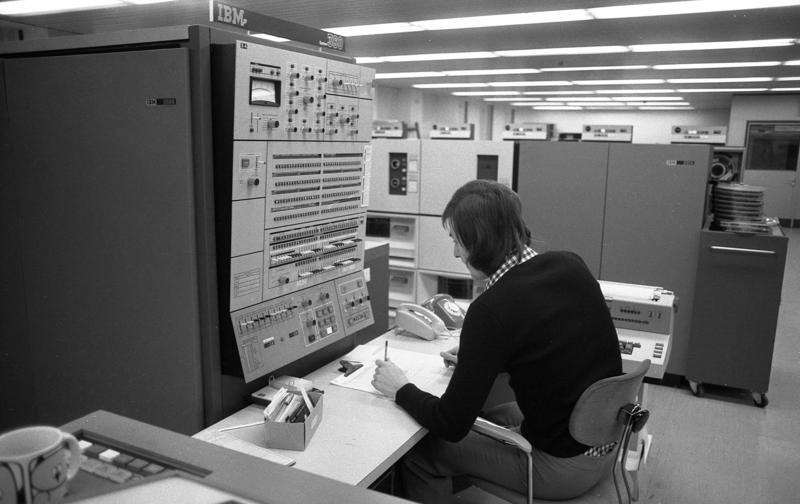
IBM System/360 Model 50 CPU, computer operator's console, and peripherals at Volkswagen

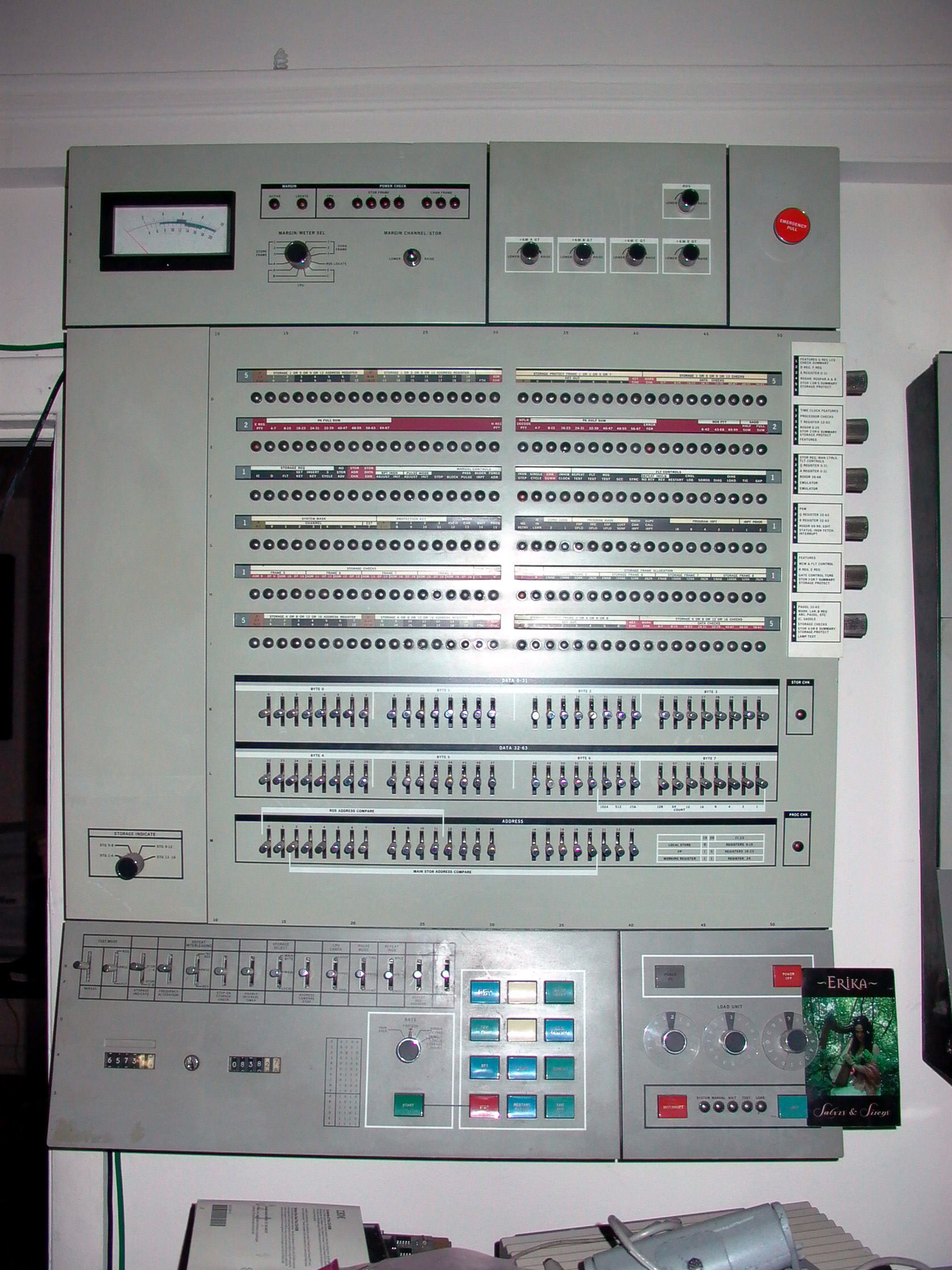
System/360 Model 65 operator's console, with register value lamps and toggle switches (middle of picture) and "emergency pull" switch (upper right)

=== Background ===
By the early 1960s, IBM was struggling with the load of supporting and upgrading five separate lines of computers. These were aimed at different market segments and were entirely different from each other. A customer who purchased a machine to handle accounting, such as the IBM 1401, that was now looking for a machine for engineering calculations, such as the IBM 7040, had no reason to select IBM – the 7040 was incompatible with the 1401 and they might as well have been from different companies. Customers were frustrated that major investments, often entirely new machines and programs, were required when seemingly small performance improvements were needed.

In 1961, IBM assembled a task force to chart their developments for the 1960s, known as SPREAD, for Systems Programming, Research, Engineering and Development. In meetings at the New Englander Motor Hotel in Greenwich, Connecticut, SPREAD developed a new concept for the next generation of IBM machines. At the time, new technologies were coming into the market including the introduction of replacement of individual transistors with small-scale integrated circuits and the move to an 8-bit byte from the former 6-bit oriented words. These were going to lead to a new generation of machines, today known as the third generation, from all of the existing vendors.

Where SPREAD differed significantly from previous concepts was what features would be supported. Instead of machines aimed at different market niches, the new concept was effectively the union of all of these designs. A single instruction set architecture (ISA) included instructions for binary, floating-point, and decimal arithmetic, string processing, conversion between character sets (a major issue before the widespread use of ASCII) and extensive support for file handling, among many other features.

This would mean IBM would be introducing yet another line of machines, once again incompatible with their earlier machines. But the new systems would be able to run all of the programs that formerly required different machines. A concern was that there was a risk that their customers, facing the purchase of yet another new and incompatible platform, would simply choose some other vendor. Yet the concept steadily gained support, and six months after being formed, the company decided to implement the SPREAD concept.

A new team was organized under the direction of Bob Evans, who personally persuaded CEO Thomas J. Watson Jr. to develop the new system. Gene Amdahl was the chief architect of the computers themselves, while Fred Brooks was the project lead for the software and Erich Bloch led the development of IBM's hybrid integrated circuit designs, Solid Logic Technology.

=== "Family" concept ===
Producing a single system design with support for all of these features, at a price acceptable to low-end customers and with a performance level acceptable to high-end customers, would border on impossible. Instead, the SPREAD concept was based on the separation of the defined feature set from its internal operation, with a family of machines with different performance and different internal designs.

Specifically, depending on the machine, some components might not be directly implemented in hardware, and would instead be completed using small programs referred to as microcode or microprograms. These small programs, or subprograms, would usually (Note: The 360/85 had a small writable control store (WCS) for compatibility features and diagnostics.) be stored in read-only memory (ROM) (Note: The original models used transformer read-only storage (TROS) and capacitor read-only storage (CROS)) inside the machine. Some models (Note: 360/20, 360/22, 360/25, 360/30, 360/40, 360/50, 360/65, 360/67, 360/85) use microcode in the central processing unit (CPU) to implement instructions while others (Note: 360/44, 360/75, 360/91, 360/95, 360/195) use only hardware. Some models (Note: 360/20, 360/22, 360/25, 360/30, 360/40, 360/50) use cycle-stealing microcode in the CPU to implement I/O channels while others (Note: 360/44, 360/65, 360/75, 360/85, 360/91, 360/95, 360/195) use only hardware in separate (Note: Originally 2860 and 2870, but IBM later announced the 2880 to support the 2835/2305 on the 360/85 and 360/195.) units. Today this approach is known as microcode.

This meant that a single lineup could have machines tailored to match the price and performance niches that formerly demanded entirely separate computer systems, where software was specific to each system. This flexibility greatly lowered barriers to entry. With most other vendors customers had to choose between machines they might outgrow or machines that were potentially too powerful and thus too costly. In practice, this meant that many companies simply did not buy computers. Now, a customer could purchase a machine that solved a particular requirement, knowing they could switch models as their needs changed, without losing support for the programs they were already running.

For instance, in the case of a firm that purchased an accounting system and was now looking to expand their computer support into engineering, this meant they could develop and test their engineering program on the machine they already used. If they ever needed more performance, they could purchase a machine with floating-point hardware, knowing that nothing else would change, it would simply get faster. Even the same peripherals could be used, allowing, for instance, data from the engineering system to be written to tape and then printed using a high-speed line printer already connected to their accounting system. Or they might replace the accounting system outright with a system with the performance to run both tasks.

The idea that a single design could address all the myriad ways that the machines could be used gave rise to the name, "360" is a reference to 360 degrees in a circle, and circles of machines and components featured prominently in IBM's advertising.

=== Models ===
IBM initially announced a series of six computers and forty common peripherals. IBM eventually delivered fourteen models, including rare one-off models for NASA. The least expensive model was the Model 20 with as little as 4096 bytes of core memory, eight 16-bit registers instead of the sixteen 32-bit registers of other System/360 models, and an instruction set that was a subset of that used by the rest of the range.

The initial announcement in 1964 included Models 30, 40, 50, 60, 62, and 70. The first three were low- to middle-range systems aimed at the IBM 1400 series market. All three first shipped in mid-1965. The last three, intended to replace the 7000 series machines, never shipped and were replaced with the 65 and 75, which were first delivered in November 1965, and January 1966, respectively.

Later additions to the low-end included models 20 (1966, mentioned above), 22 (1971), and 25 (1968). The Model 20 had several sub-models; sub-model 5 was at the higher end of the model. The Model 22 was a recycled Model 30 with minor limitations: a smaller maximum memory configuration, and slower I/O channels, which limited it to slower and lower-capacity disk and tape devices than on the 30.

The Model 44 (1966) was a specialized model, designed for scientific computing and for real-time computing and process control, featuring some additional instructions, and with all storage-to-storage instructions and five other complex instructions eliminated.

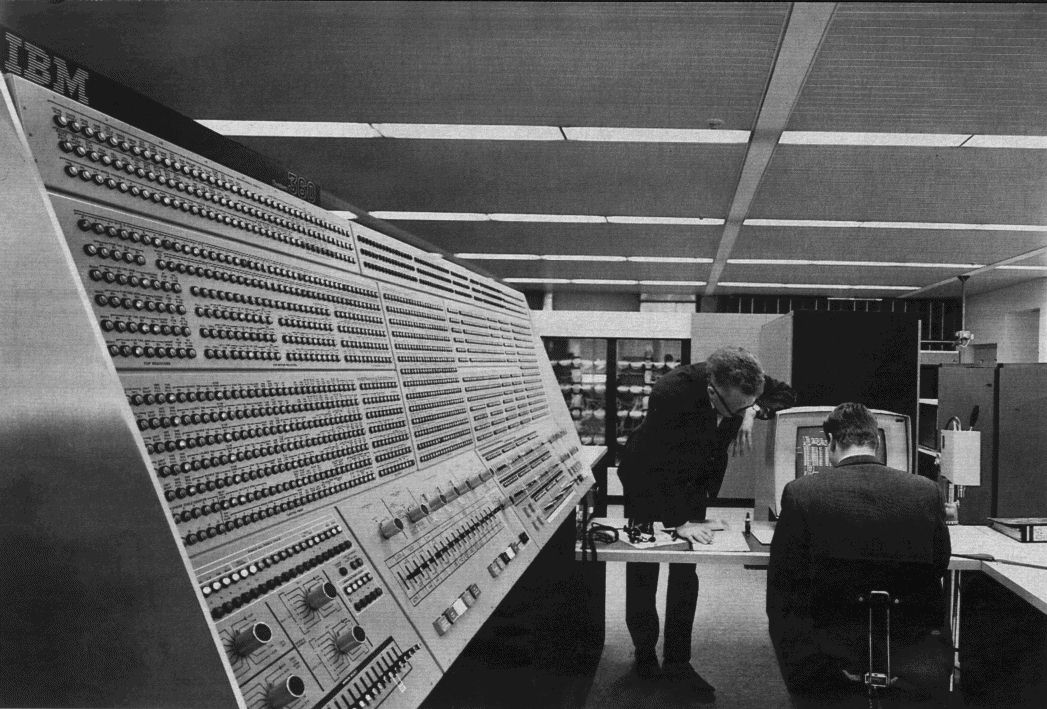
IBM System/360 Model 91 operator's console at NASA, sometime in the late 1960s.

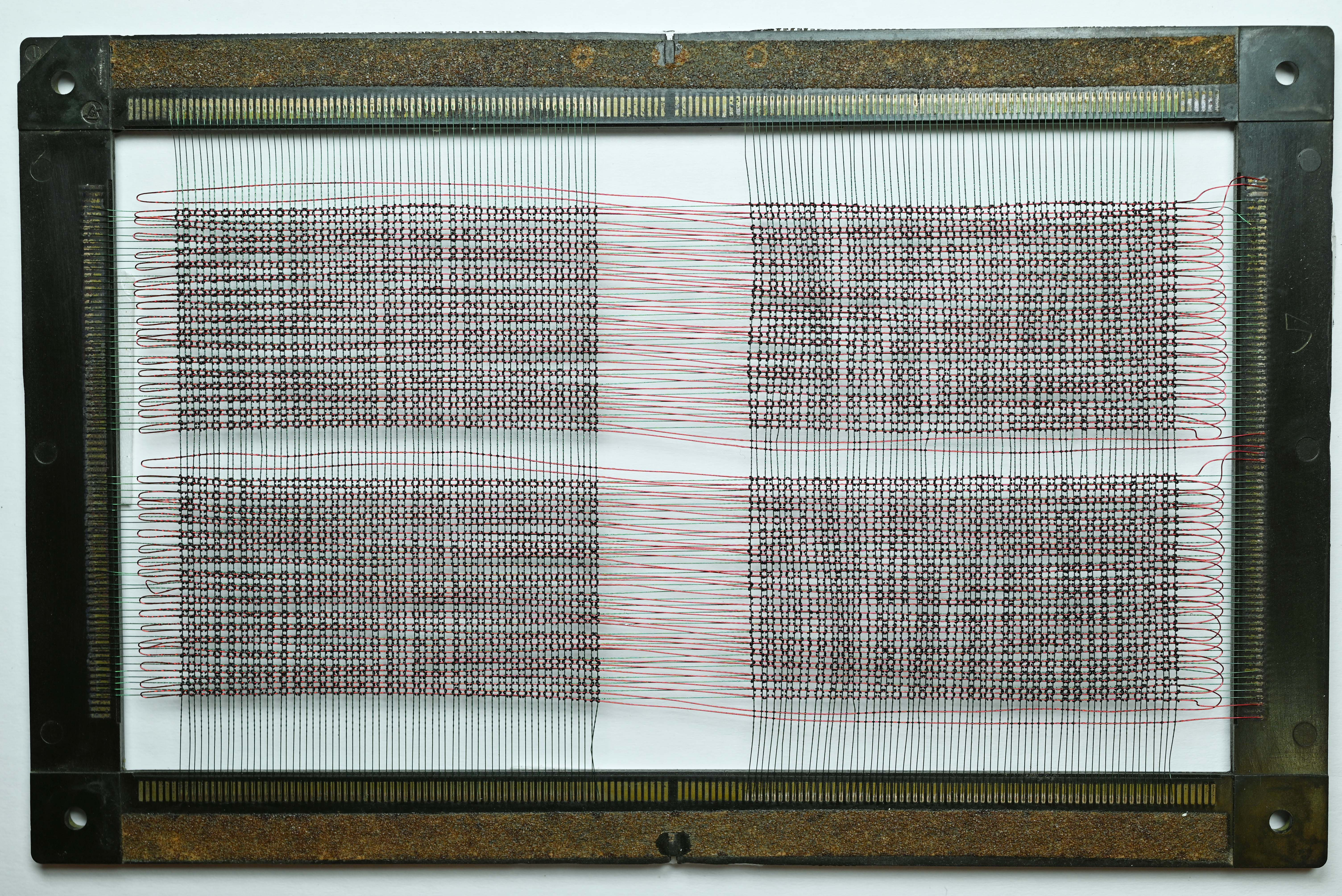
Magnetic-core memory, probably from a 360

A succession of high-end machines included the Model 67 (1966, mentioned below, briefly anticipated as the 64 and 66), 85 (1969), 91 (1967, anticipated as the 92), 95 (1968), and 195 (1971). The 85 design was intermediate between the System/360 line and the follow-on System/370 and was the basis for the 370/165. There was a System/370 version of the 195, but it did not include Dynamic Address Translation.

The implementations differed substantially, using different native data path widths, presence or absence of microcode, yet were extremely compatible. Except where specifically documented, the models were architecturally compatible. The 91, for example, was designed for scientific computing and provided out-of-order instruction execution (and could yield "imprecise interrupts" if a program trap occurred while several instructions were being read), but lacked the decimal instruction set used in commercial applications. New features could be added without violating architectural definitions: the 65 had a dual-processor version (M65MP) with extensions for inter-CPU signalling; the 85 introduced cache memory. Models 44, 75, 91, 95, and 195 were implemented with hardwired logic, rather than microcoded as all other models.

The Model 67, announced in August 1965, was the first production IBM system to offer dynamic address translation (virtual memory) hardware to support time-sharing. "DAT" is now more commonly referred to as an MMU. An experimental one-off unit was built based on a model 40. Before the 67, IBM had announced models 64 and 66, DAT versions of the 60 and 62, but they were almost immediately replaced with the 67 at the same time that the 60 and 62 were replaced with the 65. DAT hardware would reappear in the S/370 series in 1972, though it was initially absent from the series. Like its close relative, the 65, the 67 also offered dual CPUs.

IBM stopped marketing all System/360 models by the end of 1977.

=== Backward compatibility ===
IBM's existing customers had a large investment in software that ran on second-generation machines. Several System/360 models had the option of emulating the customer's existing computer using special hardware and microcode, and an emulation program that enabled existing programs to run on the new machine.

System/360 model	Emulated systems					
System/360 model	1401	1440, 1460	1410, 7010	7070, 7072, 7074	7080	709, 7090, 7094, 7094 II, 7040, 7044
Model 20	Yes					
Model 30	Yes	Yes				
Model 40	Yes	Yes	Yes			
Model 50	Yes	Yes	Yes	Yes		
Model 65				Yes	Yes	Yes
Model 85						Under OS control

Customers initially had to halt the computer and load the emulation program. IBM later added features and modified emulator programs to allow emulation of the 1401, 1440, 1460, 1410 and 7010 under the control of an operating system. The Model 85 and later System/370 maintained the precedent, retaining emulation options and allowing emulators to run under OS control alongside native programs.

=== Successors and variants ===
System/360 (excepting the Models 20, 44 (Note: There was no S/370 replacement for 44PS.) and 67 (Note: IBM did provide upgrades to CP-67/CMS and TSS/360 that ran on S/370, but without 32-bit addressing.)) was replaced with the mostly (Note: The S/370 did not have an ASCII bit in the PSW) compatible System/370 range in 1970 and Model 20 users were targeted to move to the IBM System/3. (The idea of a major breakthrough with FS technology was dropped in the mid-1970s for cost-effectiveness and continuity reasons.) Later compatible IBM systems include the 4300 family, the 308x family, the 3090, the ES/9000 and 9672 families (System/390 family), and the IBM Z series.

Computers that were mostly identical or compatible in terms of the machine code or architecture of the System/360 included Amdahl's 470 family (and its successors), Hitachi mainframes, the Magnuson Computer Systems M80 range, the UNIVAC 9000 series, Fujitsu as the Facom, the RCA Spectra 70 series, (Note: The RCA Spectra 70 had radically different architecture for interrupts and I/O. There were compatibility packages to allow operating systems for System/360 to run on a Spectra/70 and vice versa.) and the English Electric System 4. (Note: Intended for real-time processing, the English Electric System 4 employed four processor states, each with its own set of general-purpose registers. Instructions available in the user state were identical to the System/360. The other states were entered according to the class or severity of interrupt. The fourth (the highest) state was entered when power failure was imminent, and enabled the processor to shut itself down in an orderly fashion.)

The IBM 5100 portable computer, introduced in 1975, offered an option to execute the System/360's APL.SV programming language through a hardware emulator. IBM used this approach to avoid the costs and delay of creating a 5100-specific version of APL.

Special radiation-hardened and otherwise somewhat modified System/360s, in the form of the System/4 Pi avionics computer, are used in several fighter and bomber jet aircraft. In the complete 32-bit AP-101 version, 4 Pi machines were used as the replicated computing nodes of the fault-tolerant Space Shuttle computer system (in five nodes). The U.S. Federal Aviation Administration operated the IBM 9020, a special cluster of modified System/360s for air traffic control, from 1970 until the 1990s. (Some 9020 software is apparently still used via emulation on newer hardware.)

== Table of System/360 models ==
Model	Announced	Shipped	Scientific performance (kIPS) (Note: Performance calculated (not measured) based on a mix of instructions typical of scientific applications ("Gibson Mix") with the results in kilo Instructions Per Second (kIPS) per Longbottom, Roy. "Computer Speeds From Instruction Mixes – pre-1960 to 1971". except for M95 and M195. The latter based upon estimates of performance relative to M65 from Pugh.)	Commercial performance (kIPS) (Note: Using commercial instruction mix ("ADP Mix"))	CPU Bandwidth (MB/sec)	Memory bandwidth (MB/sec)	Memory size (in KiB)	Weight (lbs)	Notes
30	Apr 1964	Jun 1965	10.2	29	1.3	0.7	8–64	1,700 lb (771 kg)	
40	Apr 1964	Apr 1965	40	75	3.2	0.8	16–256	1,700–2,310 lb (771–1,048 kg) depends on memory	
50	Apr 1964	Aug 1965	133	169	8.0	2.0	64–512	4,700–7,135 lb (2,132–3,236 kg) depends on memory	Supported IBM 2361 Large Capacity Storage (LCS).
60 and 62	Apr 1964	never							Replaced by Model 65
70	Apr 1964	never							Replaced by Model 75
90	Apr 1964	never							Replaced by Model 92
92	Aug 1964	never							Redesignated as IBM System/360 Model 91
20	Nov 1964	Mar 1966	2.0	2.6			4–32	1,200–1,400 lb (544–635 kg)	16-bit, low end, limited partially incompatible instruction set
91	Jan 1966	Oct 1967	1,900	1,800	133	164	1,024–4,096		Available on special bid beginning Nov 1964
64 and 66	Apr 1965	never							Replaced by Model 67
65	Apr 1965	Nov 1965	563	567	40	21	128–1,024	4,290–8,830 lb (1,946–4,005 kg) depends on memory and number of processors	Supported LCS
75	Apr 1965	Jan 1966	940	670	41	43	256–1,024	5,125–5,325 lb (2,325–2,415 kg) depends on memory	Supported LCS
67	Aug 1965	May 1966			40	21	512–2,048	3,674 lb (1,666 kg) – Processor only	Dynamic address translation for time sharing
44	Aug 1965	Sep 1966	118	185	16	4.0	32–256	2,900–4,200 lb (1,315–1,905 kg) depends on memory	Specialized for scientific computing
95	special order	Feb 1968	3,800 est.	3,600 est.	133	711	5,220		Performance estimated as 2× Model 91
25	Jan 1968	Oct 1968	9.7	25	1.1	2.2	16–48	2,050 lb (930 kg)	
85	Jan 1968	Dec 1969	3,245	3,418	100	67	512–4,096	14,428 lb (6,544 kg) – Processor only	16–32 KB cache memory, extended-precision floating point.
195	Aug 1969	Mar 1971	10,000 est.	10,000 est.	148	169	1,024–4,096	13,450–28,350 lb (6,101–12,859 kg) depends on memory	32 KB IC cache memory. Performance estimated as 3× Model 85.
22	Apr 1971	Jun 1971			1.3	0.7	24–32	1,500 lb (680 kg)	A re-manufactured Model 30

Model summary
- Six of the twenty IBM System/360 models announced either were never shipped or were never released.
- Fourteen of the twenty IBM System/360 models announced shipped.

== Technical description ==
=== Influential features ===
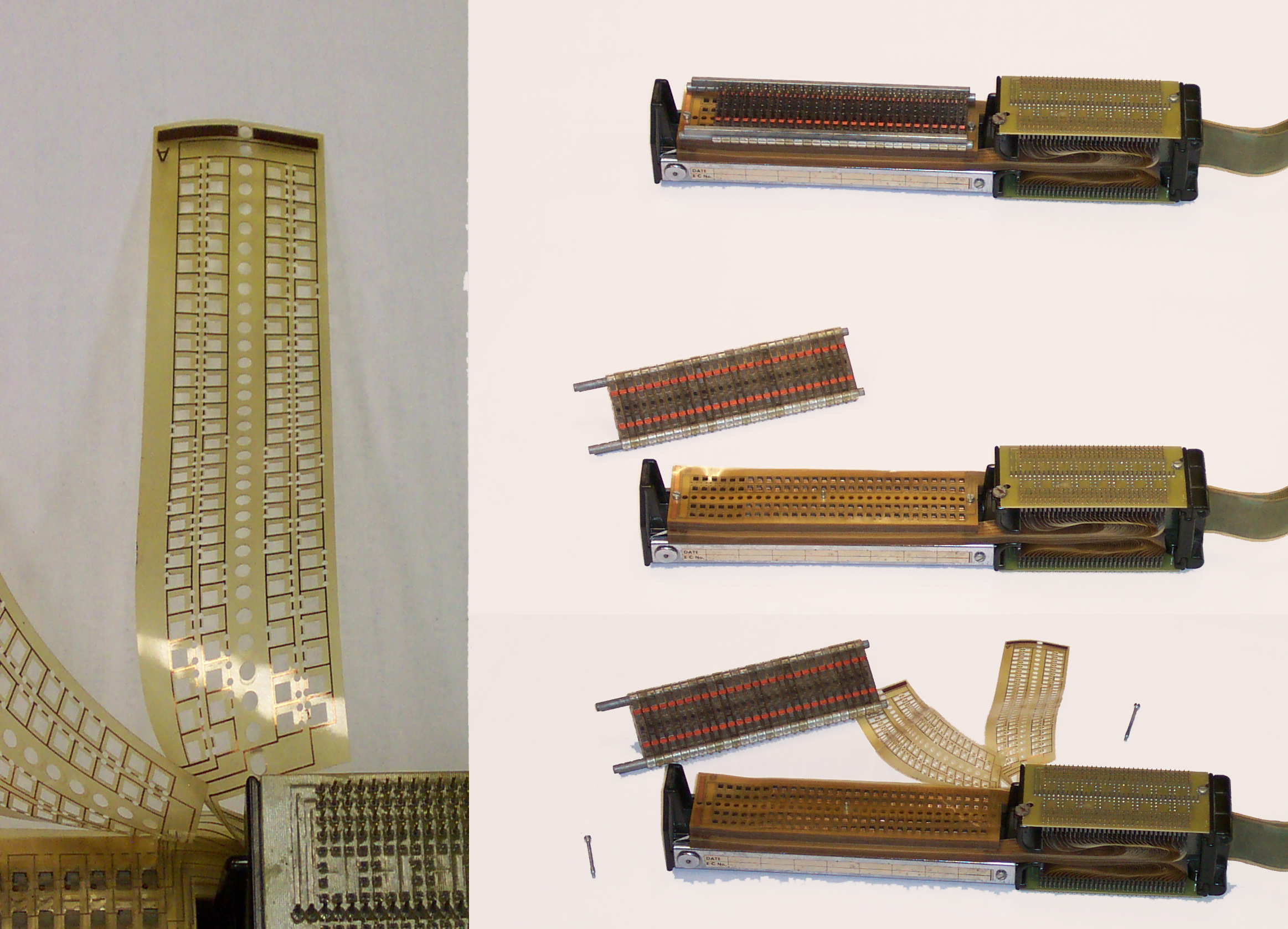
IBM System/360 Model 20 microcode transformer read-only storage (TROS) module. A Model 40 TROS module is about 50% longer than this to make room for more microcode bits in the word.

The System/360 introduced a number of industry standards to the marketplace, such as:

- The 8-bit byte (against financial pressure during development to reduce the byte to 4 or 6 bits), rather than adopting the 7030 concept of accessing bytes of variable size at arbitrary bit addresses.
- Byte-addressable memory (as opposed to bit-addressable or word-addressable memory)
- 32-bit words
- The Bus and Tag I/O channel standardized in FIPS-60
- Commercial use of microcoded CPUs
- The IBM hexadecimal floating-point architecture
- The EBCDIC character set (Note: In System/360 architecture bit 12 of the program status word (PSW) controlled selection between the EBCDIC or a then proposed ASCII-8 mode signed decimal data. The proposed ASCII-8 ANSI standard was in the approval process when System/360 was announced but it was subsequently rejected and no ASCII peripheral devices were made available. This capability was not included in System/370; bit 12 of the PSW was redefined to switch between System/360 (BC mode) and System/370 (EC mode) PSW format.)
- Nine-track magnetic tape

=== Architectural overview ===
The System/360 series computer architecture specification makes no assumptions on the implementation itself, but rather describes the interfaces and expected behavior of an implementation. The architecture describes mandatory interfaces that must be available on all implementations, and optional interfaces. Some aspects of this architecture are:

- Big endian byte ordering
- A processor with:
  - 16 32-bit general-purpose registers (R0–R15)
  - A 64-bit program status word (PSW), which describes (among other things)
    - Interrupt masks
    - Privilege states
    - A condition code
    - A 24-bit instruction address
  - An interruption mechanism, maskable and unmaskable interruption classes and subclasses
  - An instruction set. Each instruction is wholly described and also defines the conditions under which an exception is recognized in the form of program interruption.
- A memory (called storage) subsystem with:
  - 8 bits per byte
  - A special processor communication area starting at address 0
  - 24-bit addressing
- Manual control operations that allow
  - A bootstrap process (a process called Initial Program Load or IPL)
  - Operator-initiated interrupts
  - Resetting the system
  - Basic debugging facilities
  - Manual display and modifications of the system's state (memory and processor)
- An Input/Output mechanism – which does not describe the devices themselves

Some of the optional features are:

- Binary-coded decimal instructions
- Floating-point instructions
- Timing facilities (interval timer)
- Key-controlled memory protection

All models of System/360, except for the Model 20 and Model 44, implemented that specification.

Binary arithmetic and logical operations are performed as register-to-register and as memory-to-register/register-to-memory as a standard feature. If the Commercial Instruction Set option was installed, packed decimal arithmetic could be performed as memory-to-memory with some memory-to-register operations. The Scientific Instruction Set feature, if installed, provided access to four floating-point registers that could be programmed for either 32-bit or 64-bit floating-point operations. The Models 85 and 195 could also operate on 128-bit extended-precision floating-point numbers stored in pairs of floating-point registers, and software provided emulation in other models. The System/360 used an 8-bit byte, 32-bit word, 64-bit double-word, and 4-bit nibble. Machine instructions had operators with operands, which could contain register numbers or memory addresses. This complex combination of instruction options resulted in a variety of instruction lengths and formats.

Memory addressing was accomplished using a base-plus-displacement scheme, with registers 1 through F (15). A displacement was encoded in 12 bits, thus allowing a 4096-byte displacement (0–4095), as the offset from the address put in a base register.

Register 0 could not be used as a base register nor as an index register (nor as a branch address register), as "0" was reserved to indicate an address in the first 4 KB of memory, that is, if register 0 was specified as described, the value 0x00000000 was implicitly input to the effective address calculation in place of whatever value might be contained within register 0 (or if specified as a branch address register, then no branch was taken, and the content of register 0 was ignored, but any side effect of the instruction was performed).

This specific behavior permitted initial execution of an interrupt routines, since base registers would not necessarily be set to 0 during the first few instruction cycles of an interrupt routine. It isn't needed for IPL ("Initial Program Load" or boot), as one can always clear a register without the need to save it.

With the exception of the Model 67, all addresses were real memory addresses. Virtual memory was not available in most IBM mainframes until the System/370 series. The Model 67 introduced a virtual memory architecture, which MTS, CP-67, and TSS/360 used—but not IBM's mainline System/360 operating systems.

The System/360 machine-code instructions are 2 bytes long (no memory operands), 4 bytes long (one operand), or 6 bytes long (two operands). Instructions are always situated on 2-byte boundaries.

Operations like MVC (Move-Characters) (Hex: D2) can only move at most 256 bytes of information. Moving more than 256 bytes of data required multiple MVC operations. (The System/370 series introduced a family of more powerful instructions such as the MVCL "Move-Characters-Long" instruction, which supports moving up to 16 MB as a single block.)

An operand is two bytes long, typically representing an address as a 4-bit nibble denoting a base register and a 12-bit displacement relative to the contents of that register, in the range 000–FFF (shown here as hexadecimal numbers). The address corresponding to that operand is the contents of the specified general-purpose register plus the displacement. For example, an MVC instruction that moves 256 bytes (with length code 255 in hexadecimal as FF) from base register 7, plus displacement 000, to base register 8, plus displacement 001, would be coded as the 6-byte instruction "D2FF 8001 7000" (operator/length/address1/address2).

The System/360 was designed to separate the supervisor state from the problem state. This provided a basic level of security and recoverability from programming errors. Problem (user) programs could not modify data or program storage associated with the supervisor state. Addressing, data, or operation exception errors made the machine enter the supervisor state through a controlled routine so the operating system could try to correct or terminate the program in error. Similarly, it could recover certain processor hardware errors through the machine check routines.

=== Channels ===
Peripherals interfaced to the system via channels. A channel is a specialized processor with the instruction set optimized for transferring data between a peripheral and main memory. In modern terms, this could be compared to direct memory access (DMA). The S/360 connects channels to control units with bus and tag cables; IBM eventually replaced these with Enterprise Systems Connection (ESCON) and Fibre Connection (FICON) channels, but well after the S/360 era.

==== Byte-multiplexor and selector channels ====
There were initially two types of channels; byte-multiplexer channels (known at the time simply as "multiplexor channels"), for connecting "slow speed" devices such as card readers and punches, line printers, and communications controllers, and selector channels for connecting high speed devices, such as disk drives, tape drives, data cells and drums. Every System/360 (except for the Model 20, which was not a standard 360) has a byte-multiplexer channel and 1 or more selector channels, though the model 25 has just one channel, which can be either a byte-multiplexor or selector channel. The smaller models (up to the model 50) have integrated channels, while for the larger models (model 65 and above) the channels are large separate units in separate cabinets: the IBM 2870 is the byte-multiplexor channel with up to four selector sub-channels, and the IBM 2860 is up to three selector channels.

The byte-multiplexer channel is able to handle I/O to/from several devices simultaneously at the device's highest rated speeds, hence the name, as it multiplexed I/O from those devices onto a single data path to main memory. Devices connected to a byte-multiplexer channel are configured to operate in 1-byte, 2-byte, 4-byte, or "burst" mode. The larger "blocks" of data are used to handle progressively faster devices. For example, a 2501 card reader operating at 600 cards per minute would be in 1-byte mode, while a 1403-N1 printer would be in burst mode. Also, the byte-multiplexer channels on larger models have an optional selector subchannel section that would accommodate tape drives. The byte-multiplexor's channel address was typically "0" and the selector subchannel addresses were from "C0" to "FF." Thus, tape drives on System/360 were commonly addressed at 0C0–0C7. Other common byte-multiplexer addresses are: 00A: 2501 Card Reader, 00C/00D: 2540 Reader/Punch, 00E/00F: 1403-N1 Printers, 010–013: 3211 Printers, 020–0BF: 2701/2703 Telecommunications Units. These addresses are still commonly used in z/VM virtual machines.

System/360 models 40 and 50 have an integrated 1052-7 console that is usually addressed as 01F, however, this was not connected to the byte-multiplexer channel, but rather, had a direct internal connection to the mainframe. The model 30 attached a different model of 1052 through a 1051 control unit. The models 60 through 75 also use the 1052–7.

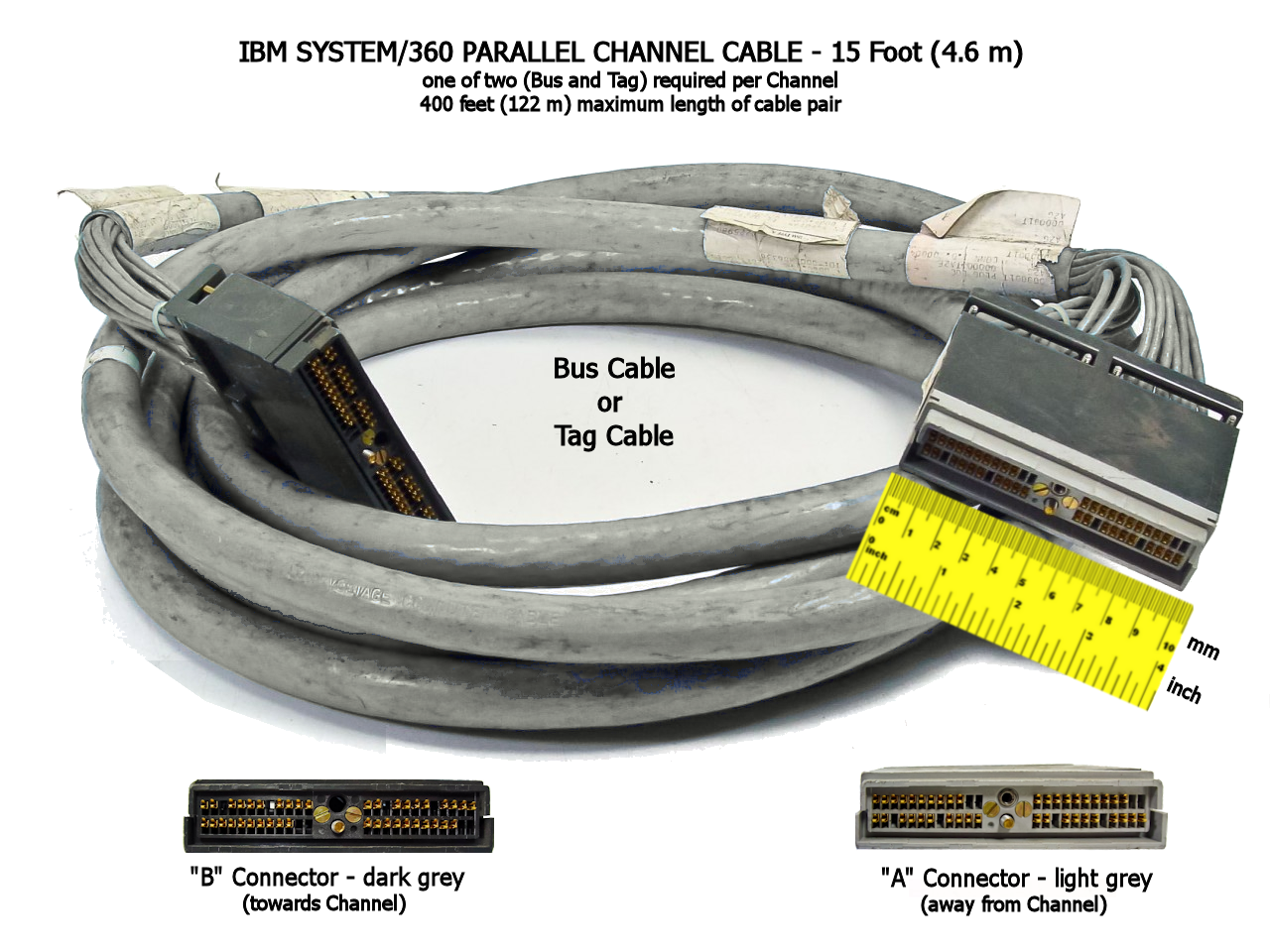
Cable used as Bus or Tag cable for IBM System/360

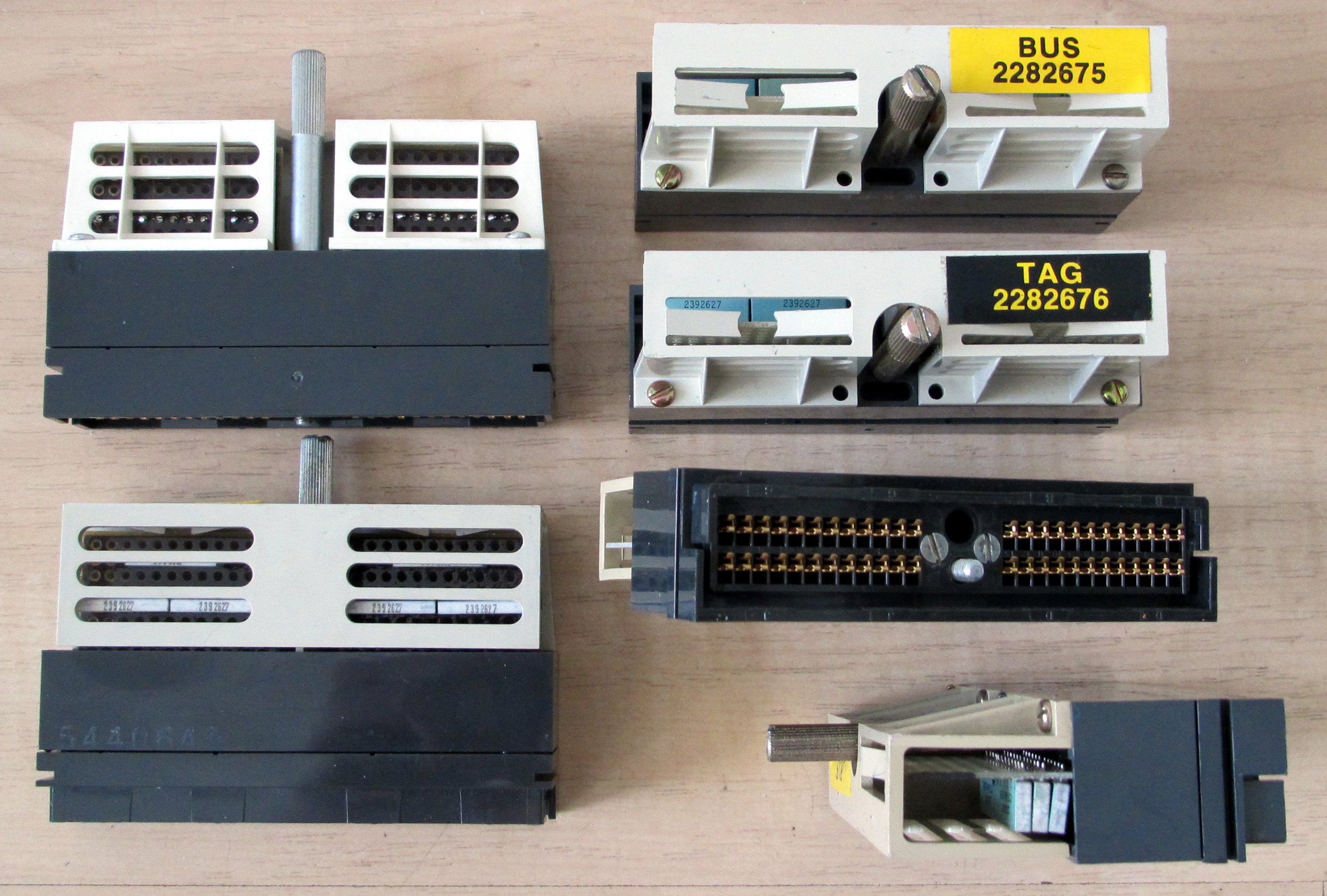
Bus and tag terminators

Selector channels enabled I/O to high speed devices. These storage devices were attached to a control unit and then to the channel. The control unit let clusters of devices be attached to the channels. On higher speed models, multiple selector channels, which could operate simultaneously or in parallel, improved overall performance.

Control units are connected to the channels with "bus and tag" cable pairs. The bus cables carried the address and data information and the tag cables identified what data was on the bus. The general configuration of a channel is to connect the devices in a chain, like this: Mainframe—Control Unit X—Control Unit Y—Control Unit Z. Each control unit is assigned a "capture range" of addresses that it services. For example, control unit X might capture addresses 40–4F, control unit Y: C0–DF, and control unit Z: 80–9F. Capture ranges had to be a multiple of 8, 16, 32, 64, or 128 devices and be aligned on appropriate boundaries. Each control unit in turn has one or more devices attached to it. For example, you could have control unit Y with 6 disks, that would be addressed as C0-C5.

There are three general types of bus-and-tag cables produced by IBM. The first is the standard gray bus-and-tag cable, followed by the blue bus-and-tag cable, and finally the tan bus-and-tag cable. Generally, newer cable revisions are capable of higher speeds or longer distances, and some peripherals specified minimum cable revisions both upstream and downstream.

The cable ordering of the control units on the channel is also significant. Each control unit is "strapped" as High or Low priority. When a device selection was sent out on a mainframe's channel, the selection was sent from X->Y->Z->Y->X. If the control unit was "high" then the selection was checked in the outbound direction, if "low" then the inbound direction. Thus, control unit X was either 1st or 5th, Y was either 2nd or 4th, and Z was 3rd in line. It is also possible to have multiple channels attached to a control unit from the same or multiple mainframes, thus providing a rich high-performance, multiple-access, and backup capability.

Typically the total cable length of a channel is limited to 200 feet, less being preferred. Each control unit accounts for about 10 "feet" of the 200-foot limit.

==== Block multiplexer channel ====
IBM first introduced a new type of I/O channel on the Model 85 and Model 195, the 2880 block multiplexer channel, and then made them standard on the System/370. This channel allowed a device to suspend a channel program, pending the completion of an I/O operation and thus to free the channel for use by another device. A block multiplexer channel can support either standard 1.5 MB/s connections or, with the 2-byte interface feature, 3 MB/s; the latter use one tag cable and two bus cables. On the S/370 there is an option for a 3.0 MB/s data streaming channel with one bus cable and one tag cable.

The initial use for this was the 2305 fixed-head disk, which has 8 "exposures" (alias addresses) and rotational position sensing (RPS).

Block multiplexer channels can operate as a selector channel to allow compatible attachment of legacy subsystems.

=== Basic hardware components ===
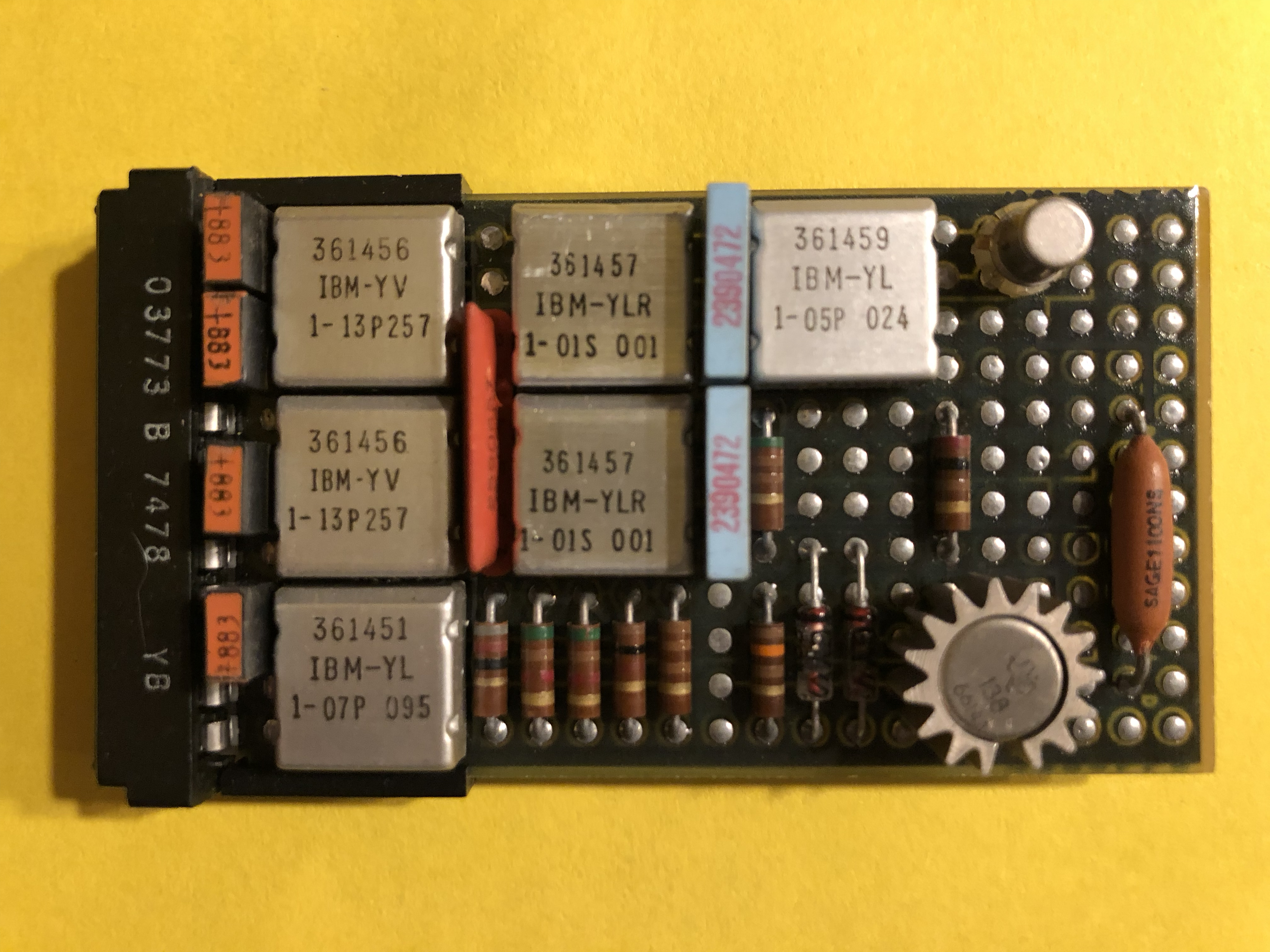
A single-width SLT card. Each square metal can contains a hybrid circuit with several transistors.

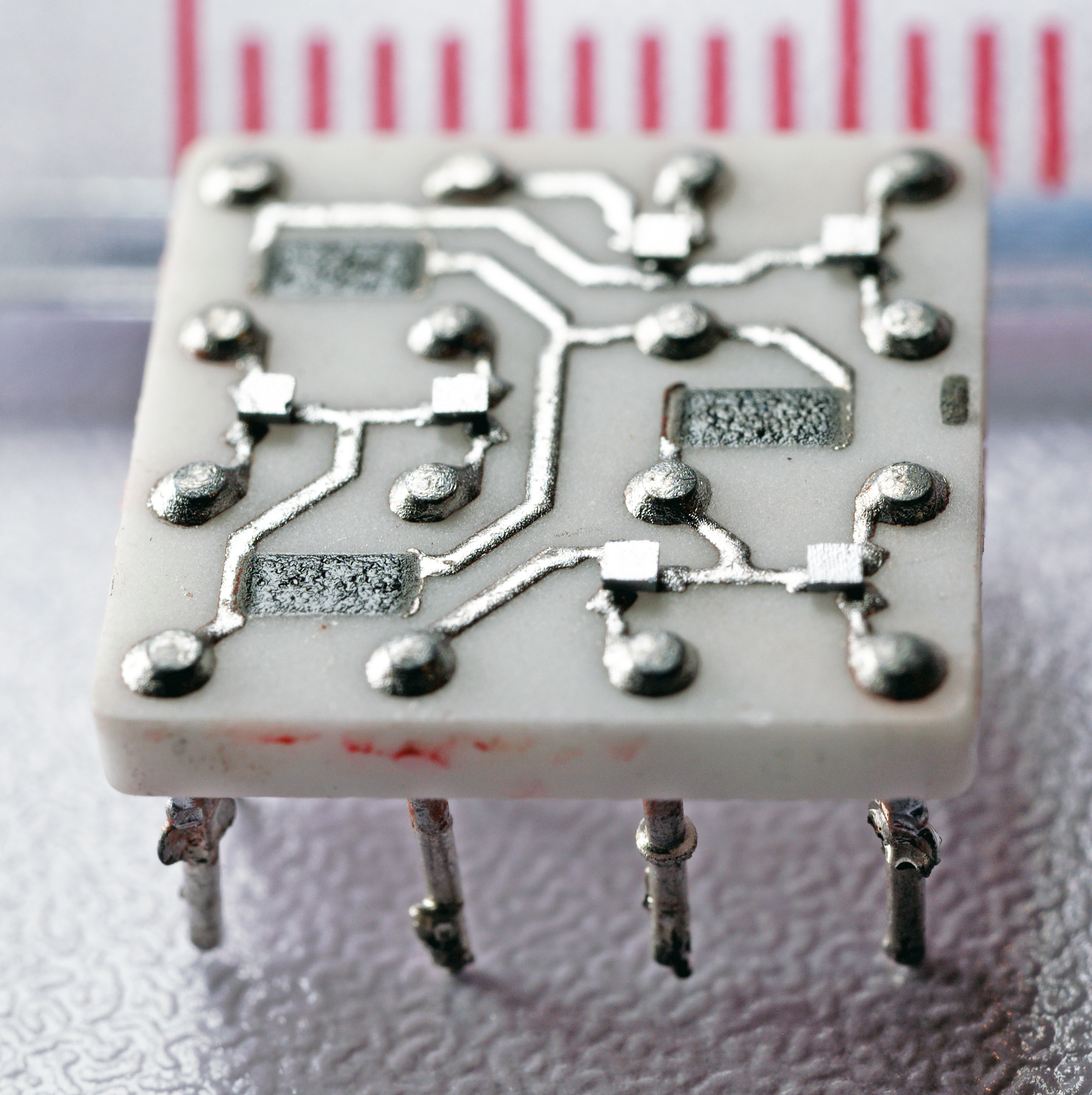
Six-transistor solid logic hybrid circuit with cap off

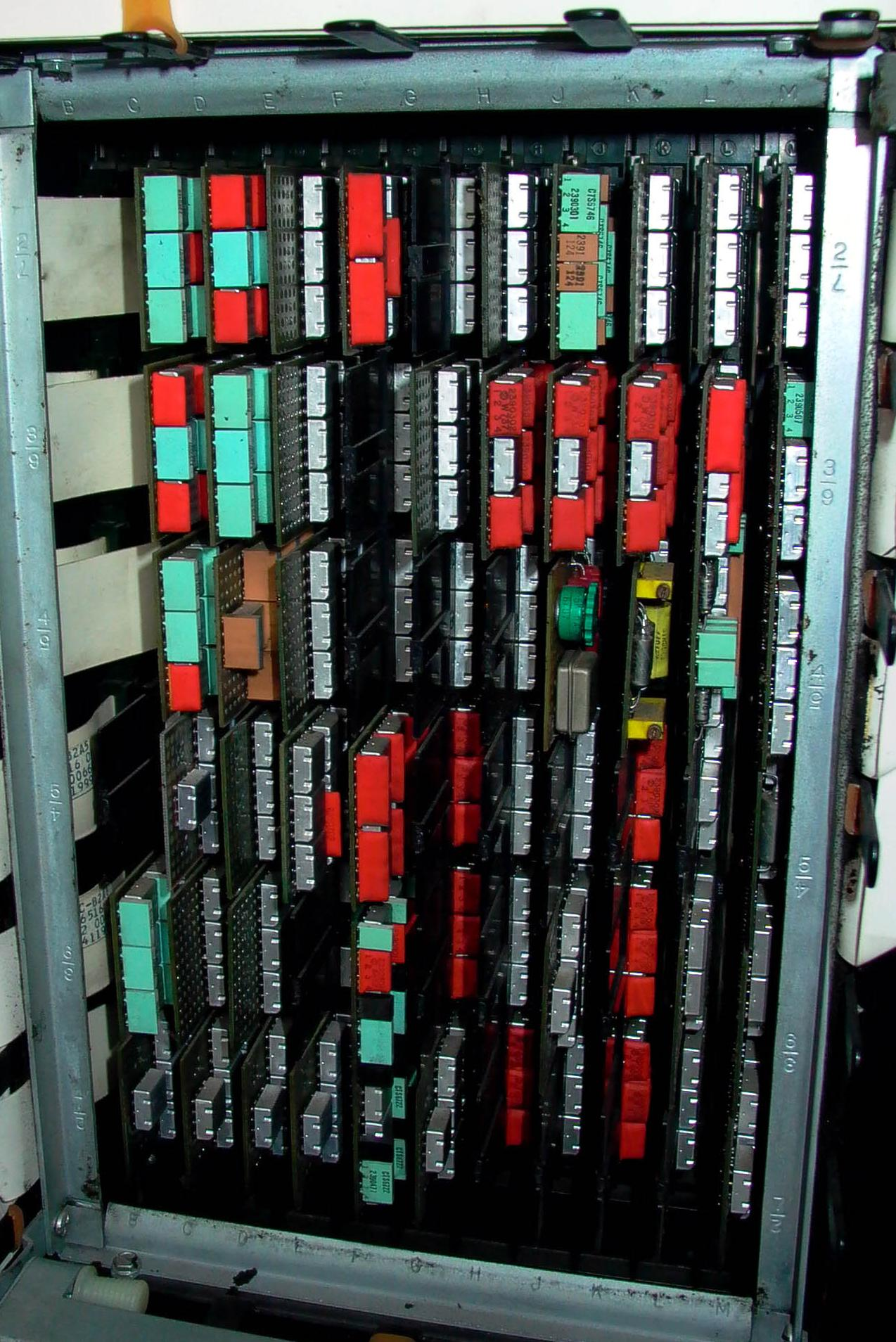
Many SLT cards plugged into an SLT backplane

Being uncertain of the reliability and availability of the then new monolithic integrated circuits, IBM chose instead to design and manufacture its own custom hybrid integrated circuits. These were built on 11 mm square ceramic substrates. Resistors were silk screened on and discrete glass encapsulated transistors and diodes were added. The substrate was then covered with a metal lid or encapsulated in plastic to create a "Solid Logic Technology" (SLT) module.

A number of these SLT modules were then flip chip mounted onto a small multi-layer printed circuit "SLT card". Each card had one or two sockets on one edge that plugged onto pins on one of the computer's "SLT boards" (also referred to as a backplane). This was the reverse of how most other company's cards were mounted, where the cards had pins or printed contact areas and plugged into sockets on the computer's boards.

Up to twenty SLT boards could be assembled side-by-side (vertically and horizontally, max 4 high by 5 wide) to form a "logic gate". Several gates mounted together constituted a box-shaped "logic frame". The outer gates were generally hinged along one vertical edge so they could be swung open to provide access to the fixed inner gates (see picture). The larger machines could have more than one frame bolted together to produce the final unit, such as a multi-frame Central Processing Unit (CPU).

=== Operating system software ===
The smaller System/360 models used the Basic Operating System/360 (BOS/360), Tape Operating System (TOS/360), or Disk Operating System/360 (DOS/360, which evolved into DOS/VS, DOS/VSE, VSE/AF, VSE/SP, VSE/ESA, and then z/VSE).

Logic frame with gates swung open showing the boards with yellow wire-wrapping.

The larger models used Operating System/360 (OS/360). IBM developed several levels of OS/360, with increasingly powerful features: Primary Control Program (PCP), Multiprogramming with a Fixed number of Tasks (MFT), and Multiprogramming with a Variable number of Tasks (MVT). MVT took a long time to develop into a usable system, and the less ambitious MFT was widely used. PCP was used on intermediate machines too small to run MFT well, and on larger machines before MFT was available; the final releases of OS/360 included only MFT and MVT. For the System/370 and later machines, MFT evolved into OS/VS1, while MVT evolved into OS/VS2 (SVS) (Single Virtual Storage), then various versions of MVS (Multiple Virtual Storage) culminating in the current z/OS.

When it announced the Model 67 in August 1965, IBM also announced TSS/360 (Time-Sharing System) for delivery at the same time as the 67. TSS/360, a response to Multics, was an ambitious project that included many advanced features. It had performance problems, was delayed, canceled, reinstated, and finally canceled (Note: However, it could still be ordered, and a TSS/370 PRPQ was available on the S/370 and went through multiple releases.) again in 1971. Customers migrated to CP-67, MTS (Michigan Terminal System), TSO (Time Sharing Option for OS/360), or one of several other time-sharing systems.

CP-67, the original virtual machine system, was also known as CP/CMS. CP/67 was developed outside the IBM mainstream at IBM's Cambridge Scientific Center, in cooperation with MIT researchers. CP/CMS eventually won wide acceptance, and led to the development of VM/370 (Virtual Machine) which had a primary interactive "sub" operating system known as VM/CMS (Conversational Monitoring System). This evolved into today's z/VM.

The Model 20 offered a simplified and rarely used tape-based system called TPS (Tape Processing System), and DPS (Disk Processing System) that provided support for the 2311 disk drive. TPS ran on a machine with 8 KB of memory; DPS required 12 KB, which was hefty for a Model 20. Many customers ran with 4 KB and CPS (Card Processing System). With TPS and DPS, the card reader was used to read the Job Control Language cards that defined the jobs to run and to read in transaction data, such as customer payments. The operating system was held on tape or disk, and results could also be stored on tape or disk. Stacked job processing became an exciting possibility for the adventurous computer user.

A little-known and little-used suite of 80-column punched-card utility programs known as Basic Programming Support (BPS) (jocularly: Barely Programming Support), a precursor of TOS, was available for smaller systems.

== Component names ==
IBM created a new naming system for the new components created for System/360, although well-known old names, like IBM 1403 and IBM 1052, were retained. In this new naming system, components were given four-digit numbers starting with 2. The second digit described the type of component, as follows:

20xx:	Arithmetic processors, for example the IBM 2030, which was the CPU for the IBM System/360 Model 30.
21xx:	Power supplies and other equipment intimately associated with processors, for example the IBM 2167 Configuration Unit.
22xx:	Visual output devices, for example the IBM 2250 and IBM 2260 CRT displays, and the IBM 2203 line printer for the System/360 model 20.
23xx:	Direct-access storage devices, for example the IBM 2311 and IBM 2314 disk drives, the IBM 2321 Data Cell; Main storage such as the IBM 2361 Large Capacity Storage (Core Storage, Large Core Storage or LCS) and the IBM 2365 Processor Storage.
24xx:	Magnetic tape drives, for example the IBM 2401, IBM 2405 and IBM 2415.
25xx:	Punched card handling equipment, for example the IBM 2501 (card reader), IBM 2520 (card punch); IBM 2540 (reader/punch) and IBM 2560 (Multi-Function Card Machine or MFCM).
26xx:	Paper tape handling equipment, for example the IBM 2671 paper tape reader.
27xx:	Communications equipment, for example the IBM 2701, IBM 2705, IBM 2741 interactive terminal and the IBM 2780 batch terminal.
28xx:	Channels and controllers, for example the IBM 2821 Control Unit, IBM 2841 and IBM 2844.
29xx:	Miscellaneous devices, for example the IBM 2914 Data Channel Switch and the IBM 2944 Data Channel Repeater.

== Peripherals ==
IBM developed a new family of peripheral equipment for System/360, carrying over a few from its older 1400 series. Interfaces were standardized, allowing greater flexibility to mix and match processors, controllers and peripherals than in the earlier product lines.

In addition, System/360 computers could use certain peripherals that were originally developed for earlier computers. These earlier peripherals used a different numbering system, such as the IBM 1403 chain printer. The 1403, an extremely reliable device that had already earned a reputation as a workhorse, was sold as the 1403-N1 when adapted for the System/360.

Also available were optical character recognition (OCR) readers IBM 1287 and IBM 1288 which could read Alpha Numeric (A/N) and Numeric Hand Printed (NHP/NHW) Characters from Cashier's rolls of tape to full legal size pages. At the time this was done with very large optical/logic readers. Software was too slow and expensive at that time.

Models 65 and below sold with an IBM 1052–7 as the console typewriter. The 360/85 with feature 5450 uses a display console that was not compatible with anything else in the line; the later 3066 console for the 370/165 and 370/168 use the same basic display design as the 360/85. The IBM System/360 models 91 and 195 use a graphical display similar to the IBM 2250 as their primary console.

Additional operator consoles were also available. Certain high-end machines could optionally be purchased with a 2250 graphical display, costing upwards of US$100,000; smaller machines could use the less expensive 2260 display or later the 3270.

=== Direct access storage devices (DASD) ===
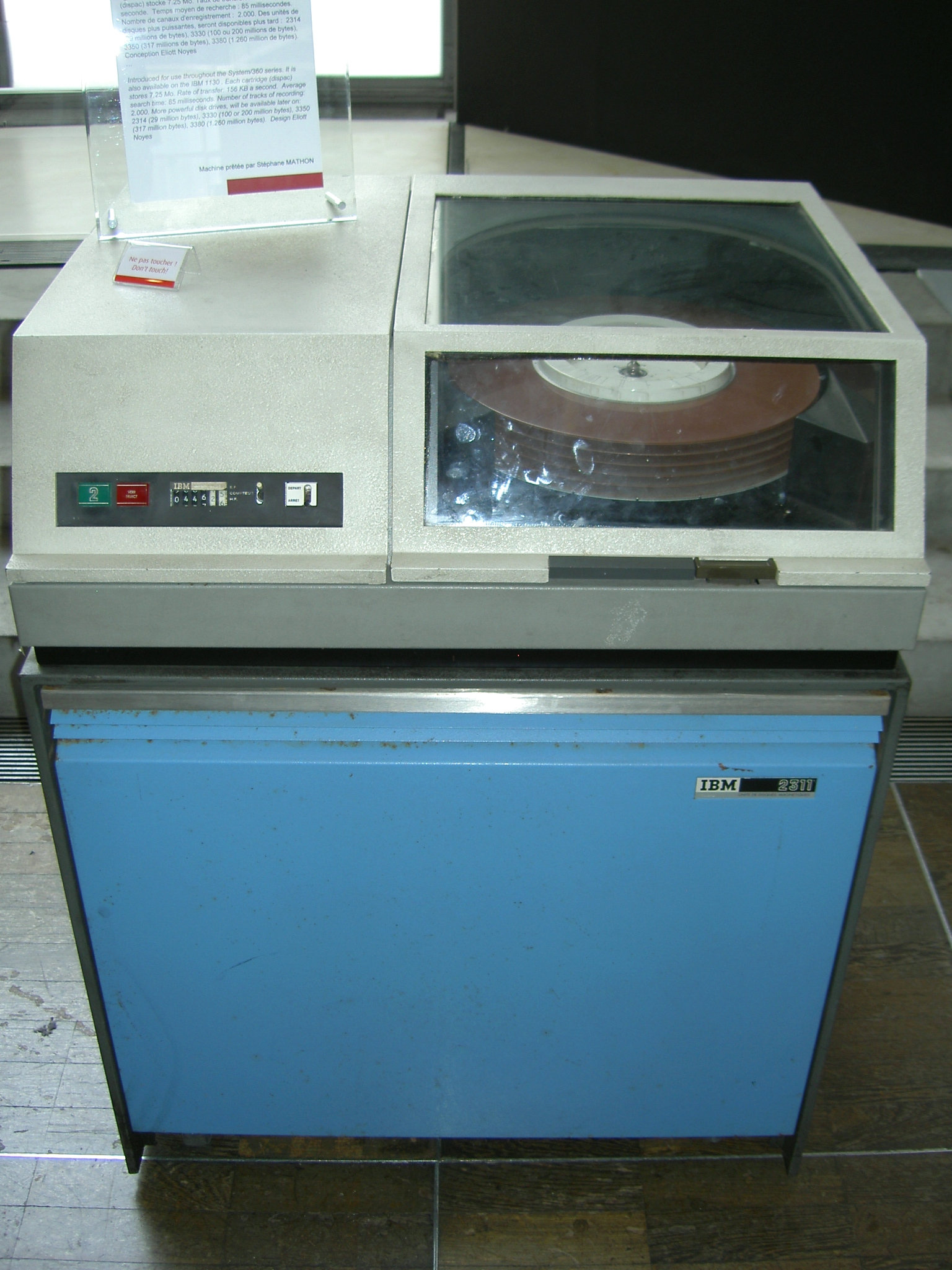
IBM 2311 disk drive

The first disk drives for System/360 were IBM 2302s and IBM 2311s. The first drum for System/360 was the IBM 7320.

The 156 kbit/s 2302 was based on the earlier 1302 and was available as a model 3 with two 112.79 MB modules or as a model 4 with four such modules.

The 2311, with a removable 1316 disk pack, was based on the IBM 1311 and had a theoretical capacity of 7.2 MB, although actual capacity varied with record design. (When used with a 360/20, the 1316 pack was formatted into fixed-length 270 byte sectors, giving a maximum capacity of 5.4MB.)

In 1966, the first 2314s shipped. This device had up to eight usable disk drives with an integral control unit; there were nine drives, but one was reserved as a spare. Each drive used a removable 2316 disk pack with a capacity of nearly 28 MB. The disk packs for the 2311 and 2314 were physically large by today's standards — e.g., the 1316 disk pack was about 14 in (36 cm) in diameter and had six platters stacked on a central spindle. The top and bottom outside platters did not store data. Data were recorded on the inner sides of the top and bottom platters and both sides of the inner platters, providing 10 recording surfaces. The 10 read/write heads moved together across the surfaces of the platters, which were formatted with 203 concentric tracks. To reduce the amount of head movement (seeking), data was written in a virtual cylinder from inside top platter down to inside bottom platter. These disks were not usually formatted with fixed-sized sectors as are today's hard drives (though this was done with CP/CMS). Rather, most System/360 I/O software could customize the length of the data record (variable-length records), as was the case with magnetic tapes.

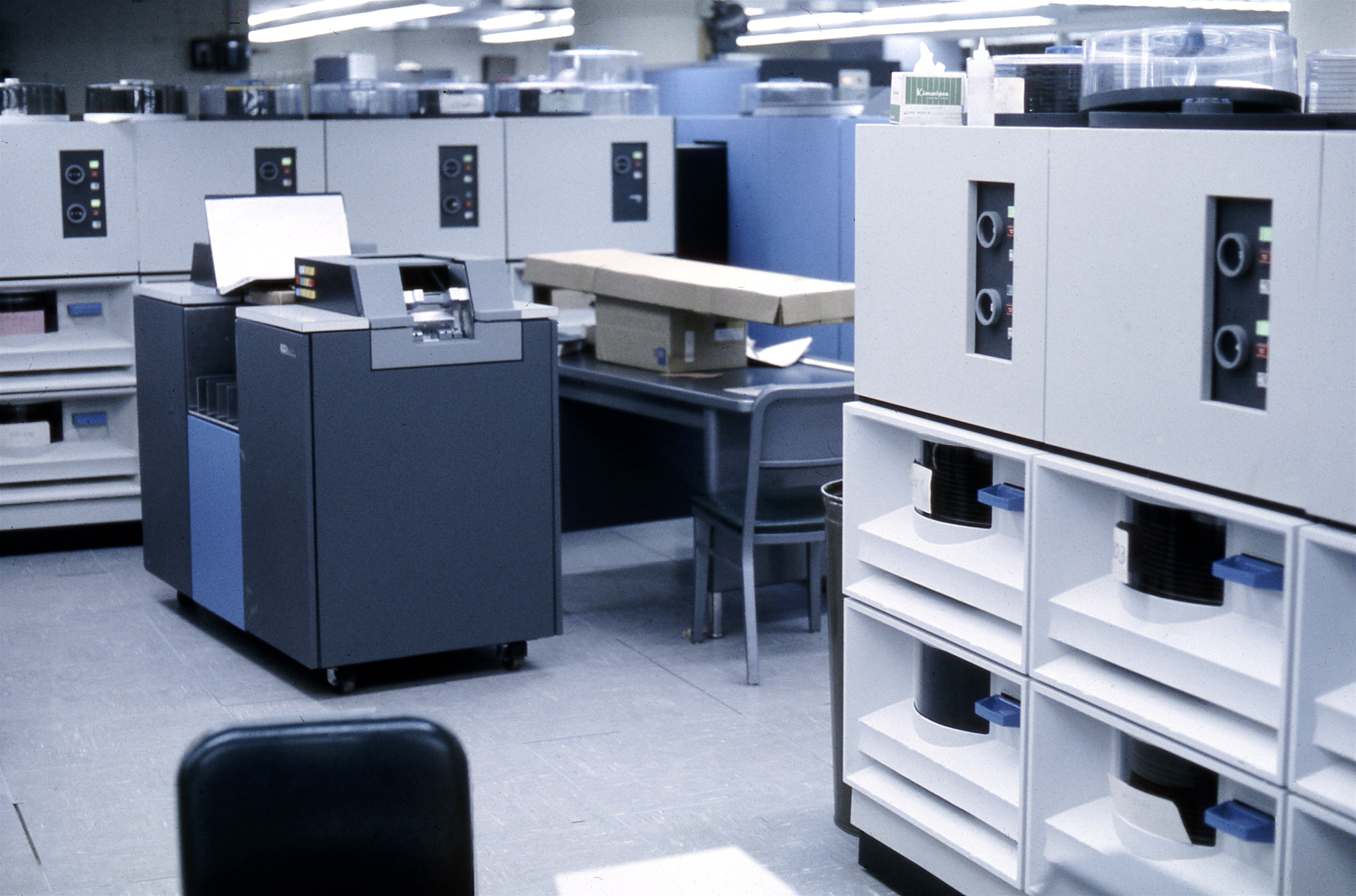
IBM 2314 disk drives and IBM 2540 card reader/punch at the University of Michigan

Some of the most powerful early System/360s used high-speed head-per-track drum storage devices. The 3,500 RPM 2301, which replaced the 7320, was part of the original System/360 announcement, with a capacity of 4 MB. The 303.8 kbit/s IBM 2303 was announced on January 31, 1966, with a capacity of 3.913 MB. These were the only drums announced for System/360 and System/370, and their niche was later filled by fixed-head disks.

The 6,000 RPM 2305 appeared in 1970, with capacities of 5 MB (2305–1) or 11 MB (2305–2) per module. Although these devices did not have large capacity, their speed and transfer rates made them attractive for high-performance needs. A typical use was overlay linkage (e.g. for OS and application subroutines) for program sections written to alternate in the same memory regions. Fixed-head disks and drums were particularly effective as paging devices on the early virtual memory systems. The 2305, although often called a "drum" was actually a head-per-track disk device, with 12 recording surfaces and a data transfer rate up to 3 MB/s.

Rarely seen was the IBM 2321 Data Cell, a mechanically complex device that contained multiple magnetic strips to hold data; strips could be randomly accessed, placed upon a cylinder-shaped drum for read/write operations; then returned to an internal storage cartridge. The IBM Data Cell [noodle picker] was among several IBM trademarked "speedy" mass online direct-access storage peripherals (reincarnated in recent years as "virtual tape" and automated tape librarian peripherals). The 2321 file had a capacity of 400 MB, at the time when the 2311 disk drive only had 7.2 MB. The IBM Data Cell was proposed to fill cost/capacity/speed gap between magnetic tapes—which had high capacity with relatively low cost per stored byte—and disks, which had higher expense per byte. Some installations also found the electromechanical operation less dependable and opted for less mechanical forms of direct-access storage.

The Model 44 was unique in offering an integrated single-disk drive as a standard feature. This drive used the 2315 "ramkit" cartridge and provided 1,171,200 bytes of storage.

=== Magnetic tape drives ===
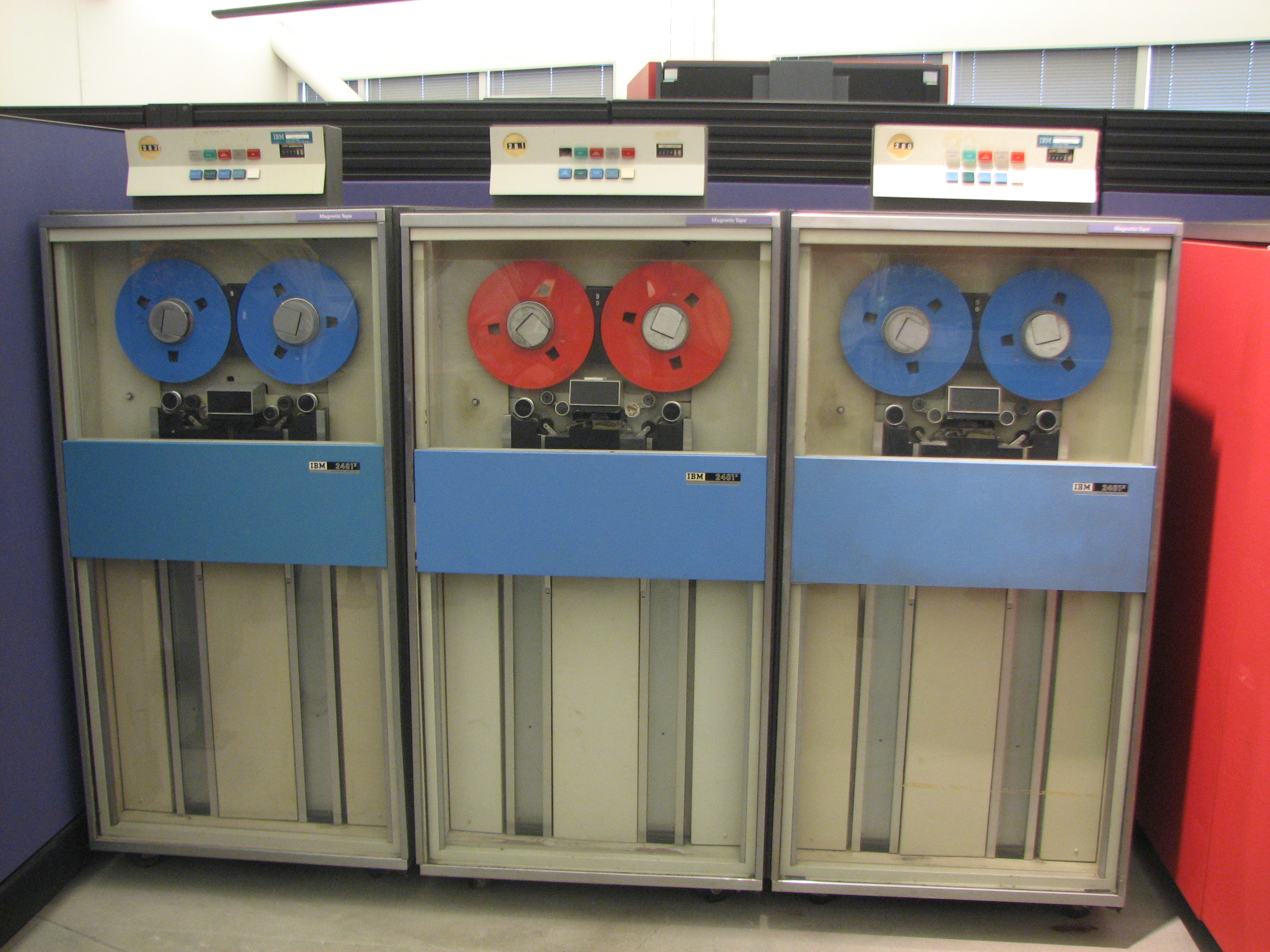
IBM 2401 tape drives

The 2400-series of 1/2" magnetic tape units consisted of the 2401 and 2402 Models 1-6 Magnetic Tape Units, the 2403 Models 1-6 Magnetic Tape Unit and Control, the 2404 Models 1-3 Magnetic Tape Unit and Control, and the 2803/2804 Models 1 and 2 Tape Control Units. The later 2415 Magnetic Tape Unit and Control, introduced in 1967 contained two, four, or six tape drives and a control in a single unit, and was slower and cheaper. The 2415 drives and control were not marketed separately. With System/360, IBM switched from IBM 7-track to 9-track tape format. Some 2400-series drives could be purchased that read and wrote 7-track tapes for compatibility with the older IBM 729 tape drives. In 1968, the IBM 2420 tape system was released, offering much higher data rates, self-threading tape operation and 1600bpi packing density. It remained in the product line until 1979.

=== Unit record devices ===
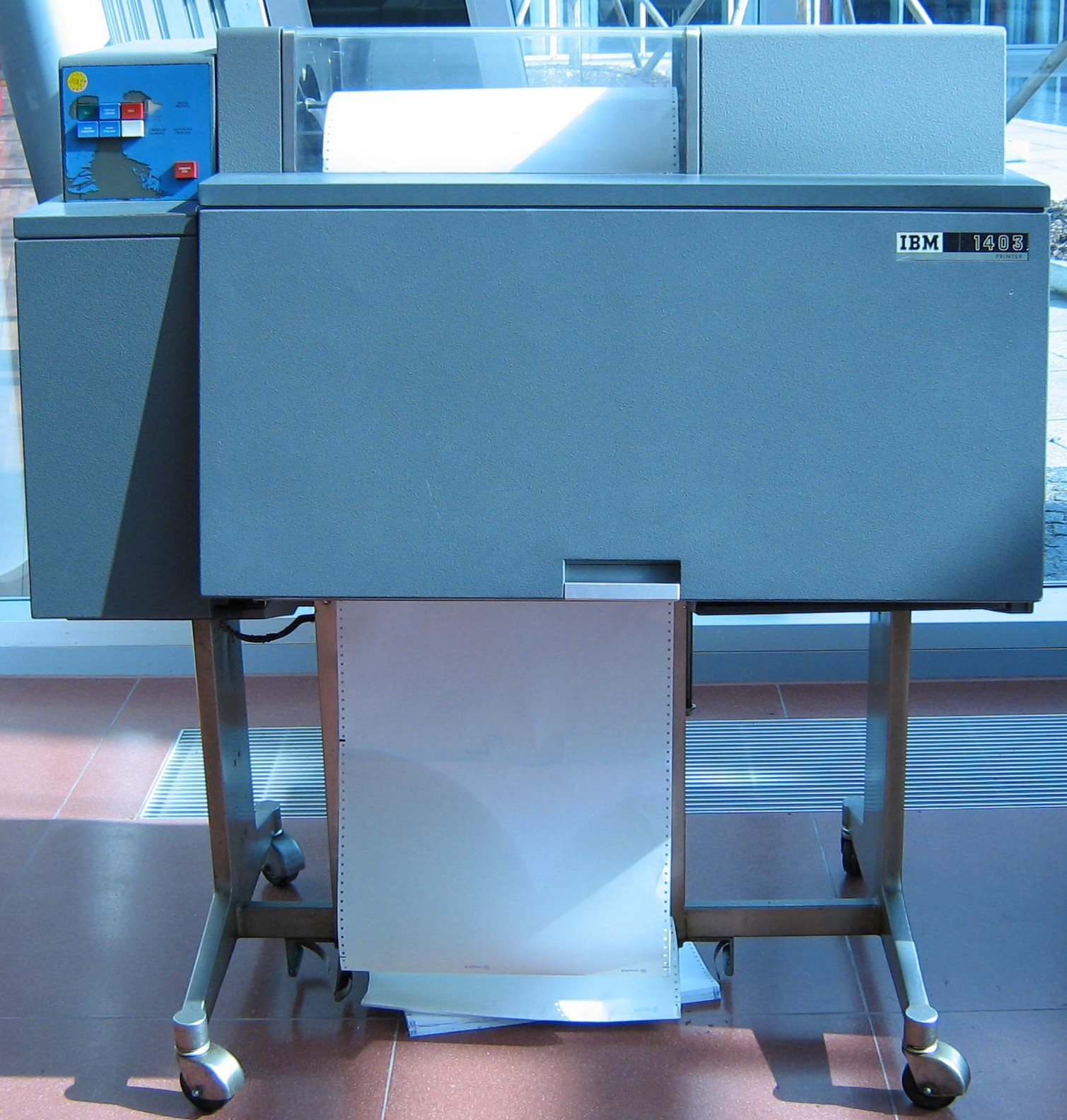
IBM 1403 line printer

- Punched card devices included the 2501 card reader and the 2540 card reader punch. Virtually every System/360 had a 2540. The 2560 MFCM ("Multi-Function Card Machine") reader/sorter/punch, listed above, was for the Model 20 only. It was notorious for reliability problems (earning humorous acronyms often involving "...Card Muncher" or "Mal-Function Card Machine").
- Line printers were the IBM 1403 and the slower IBM 1443.
- A paper tape reader, the IBM 2671, was introduced in 1964. It had a rated speed of 1,000 cps. There were also a paper tape reader and paper tape punch from an earlier era, available only as RPQs (Request Price Quotation). The 1054 (reader) and 1055 (punch), which were carried forward (like the 1052 console typewriter) from the IBM 1050 Teleprocessing System. All these devices operated at a maximum of 15.5 characters per second. The paper tape punch from the IBM 1080 System was also available by RPQ, but at a prohibitively expensive price.
- Optical character recognition (OCR) devices 1287 and later the 1288 were available on the 360's. The 1287 could read handwritten numerals, some OCR fonts, and cash register OCR paper tape reels. The 1288 'page reader' could handle up to legal size OCR font typewritten pages, as well as handwritten numerals. Both of these OCR devices employed a 'flying spot' scanning principle, with the raster scan provided by a large CRT, and the reflected light density changes were picked up by a high gain photomultiplier tube.
- Magnetic ink character recognition (MICR) was provided by the IBM 1412 and 1419 cheque sorters, with magnetic ink printing (for cheque books) on 1445 printers (a modified 1443 that used an MICR ribbon). 1412/1419 and 1445 were mainly used by banking institutions.

== Remaining machines ==
Despite having been sold or leased in very large numbers for a mainframe system of its era, only a few of System/360 computers remain—mainly as non-operating property of museums or collectors. Examples of existing systems include:

- The Computer History Museum in Mountain View, California, has a non-working Model 30 on display, as do the Museum of Transport and Technology in Auckland, New Zealand, and the Vienna University of Technology in Austria.
- The University of Western Australia Computer Club has a complete Model 40 in storage.
- The KCG Computer Museum of Kyoto Computer Gakuin, Japan's first computer school in town, has an IBM System/360 Model 40 on display.
- Two Model 20 systems were purchased by UK enthusiasts. As of 2024 they are on long-term loan to the System Source Computer Museum for display and restoration.
- The Living Computers: Museum + Labs had a 360 model 30 before it closed in February 2020.

A running list of remaining System/360s that are more than just 'front panels' can be found at World Inventory of remaining System/360 CPUs.

== Gallery ==
This gallery shows the operator's console, with register indicator lamps, toggle switches (middle of pictures), and "emergency pull" switch (upper right of pictures) of the various models.

Model 20

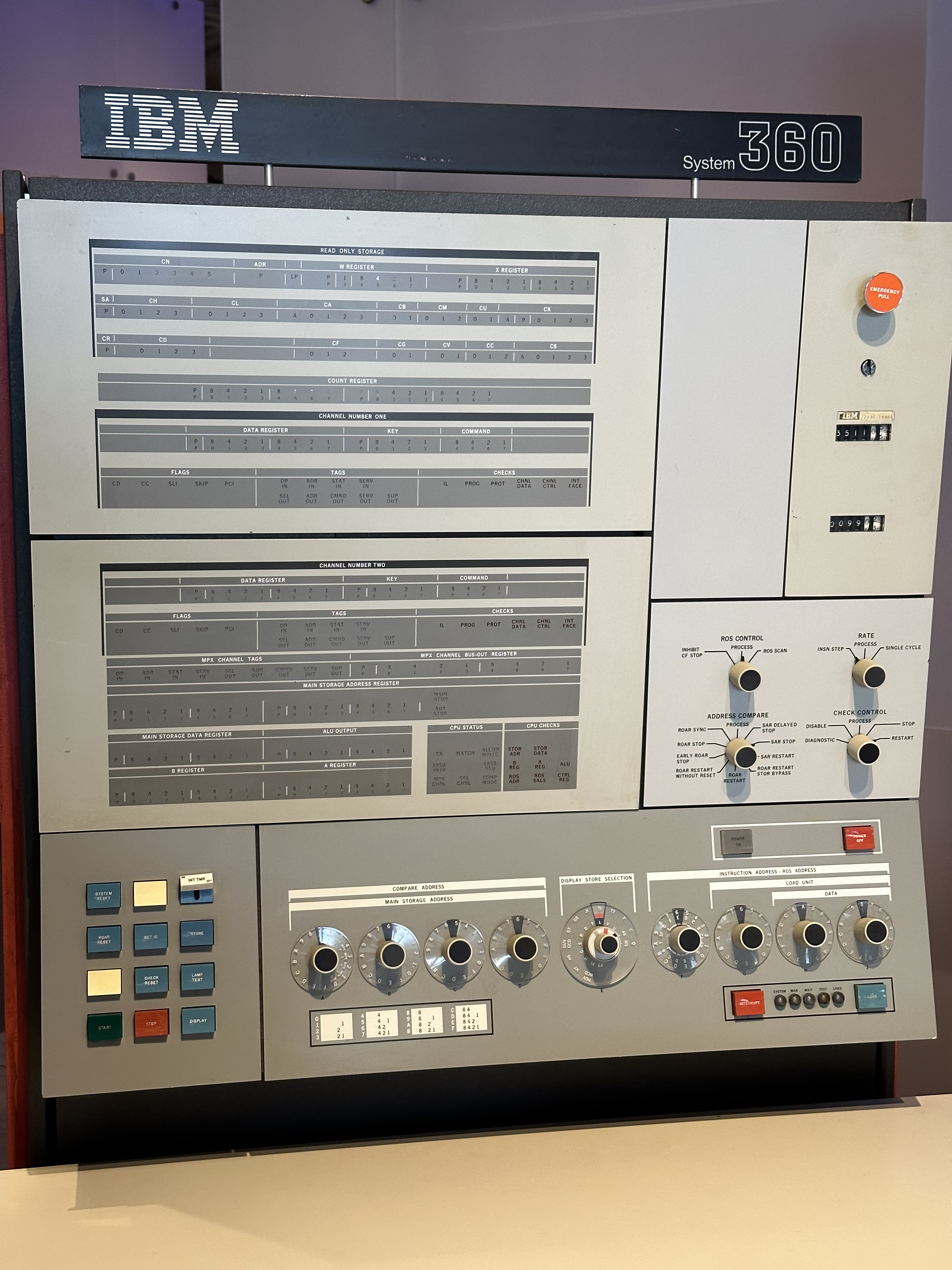
Model 30

Model 40

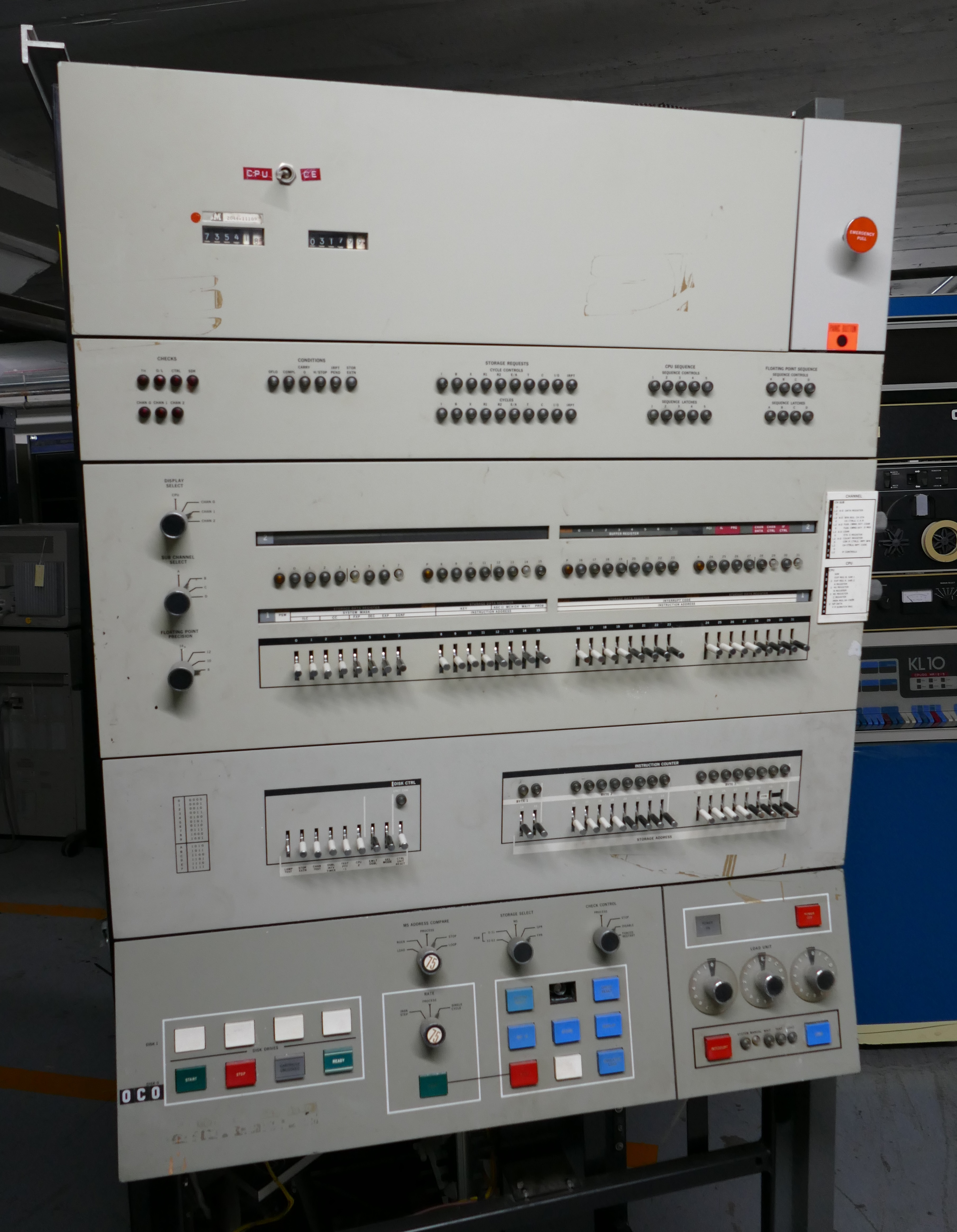
Model 44

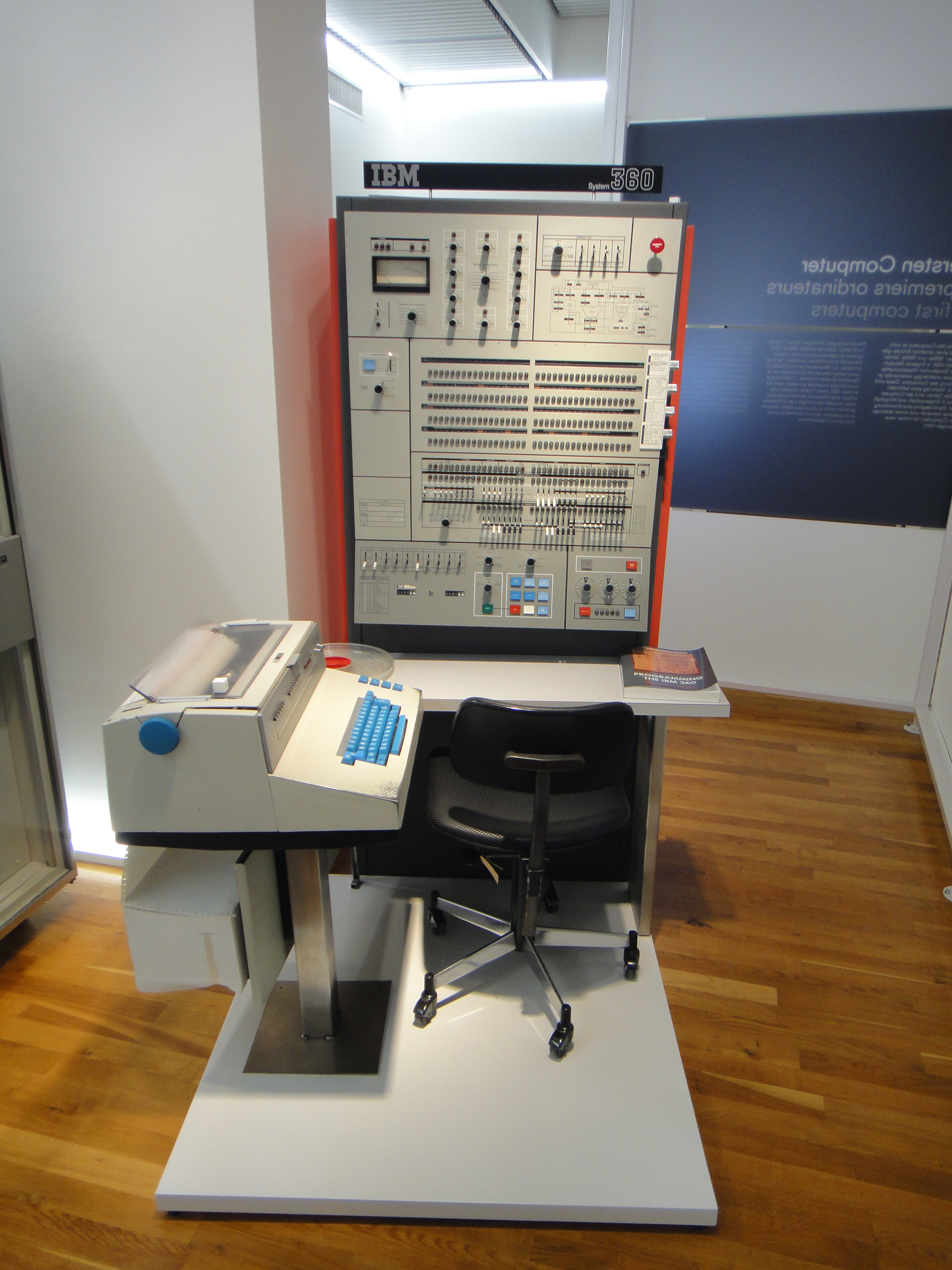
Model 50

Model 50 control panel

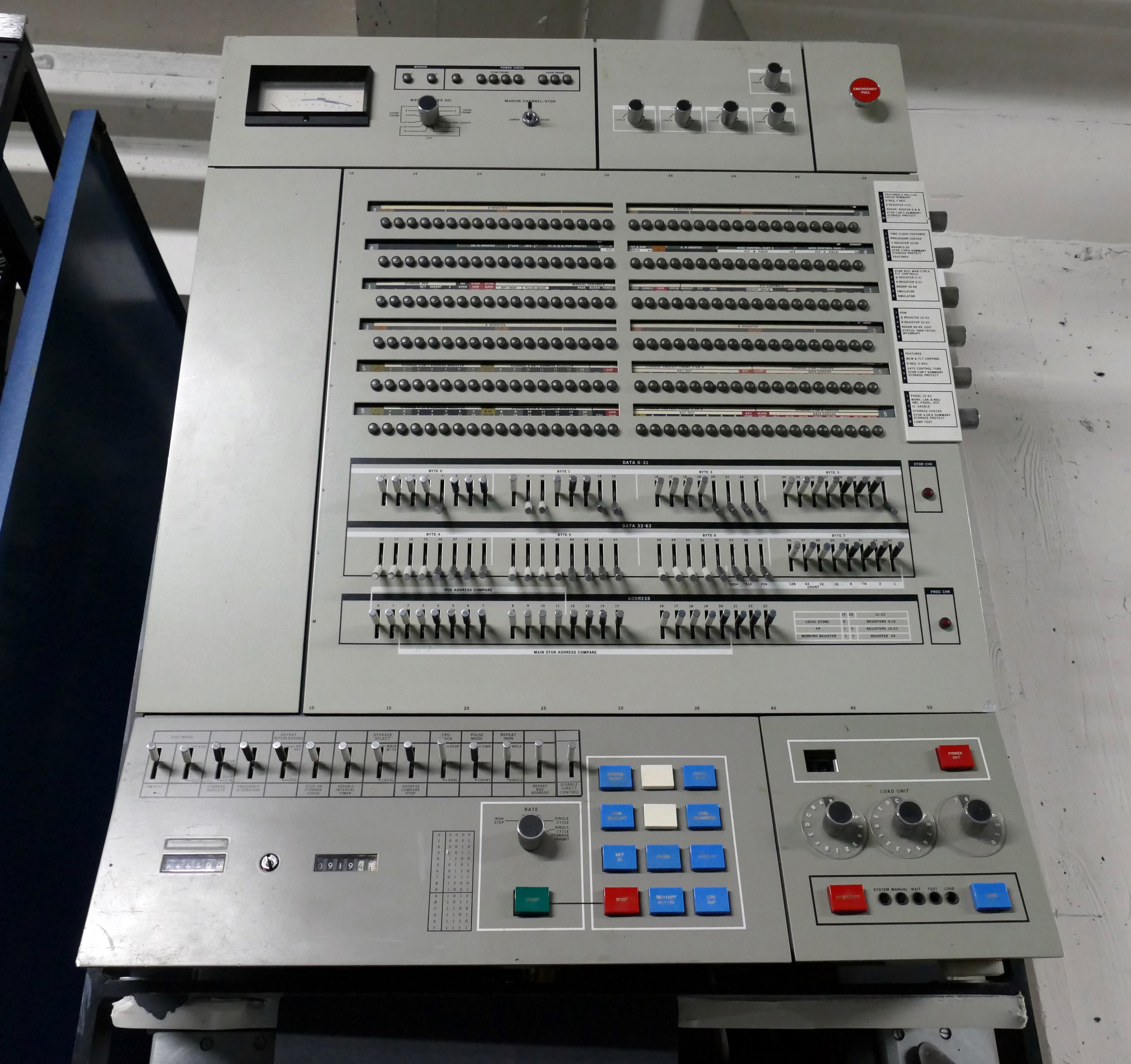
Model 65

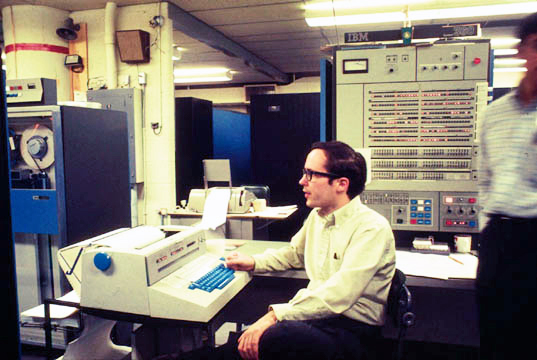
Model 67

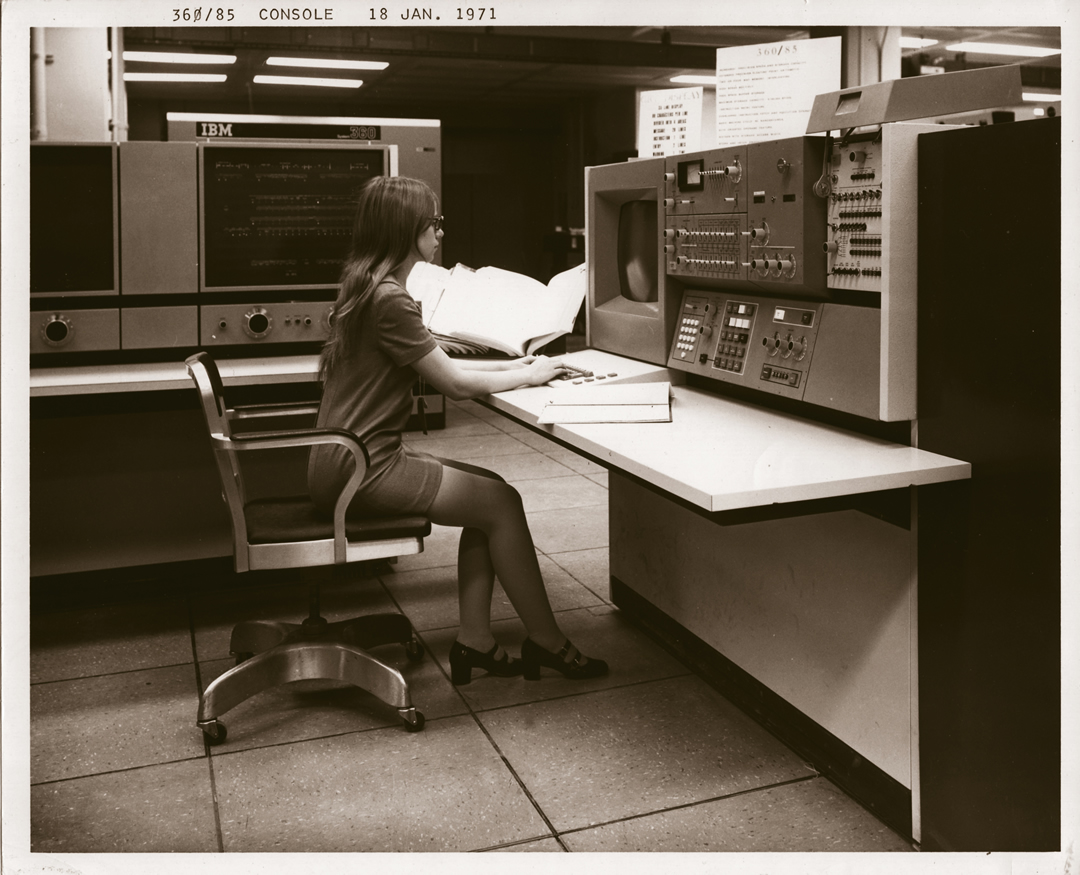
Model 85

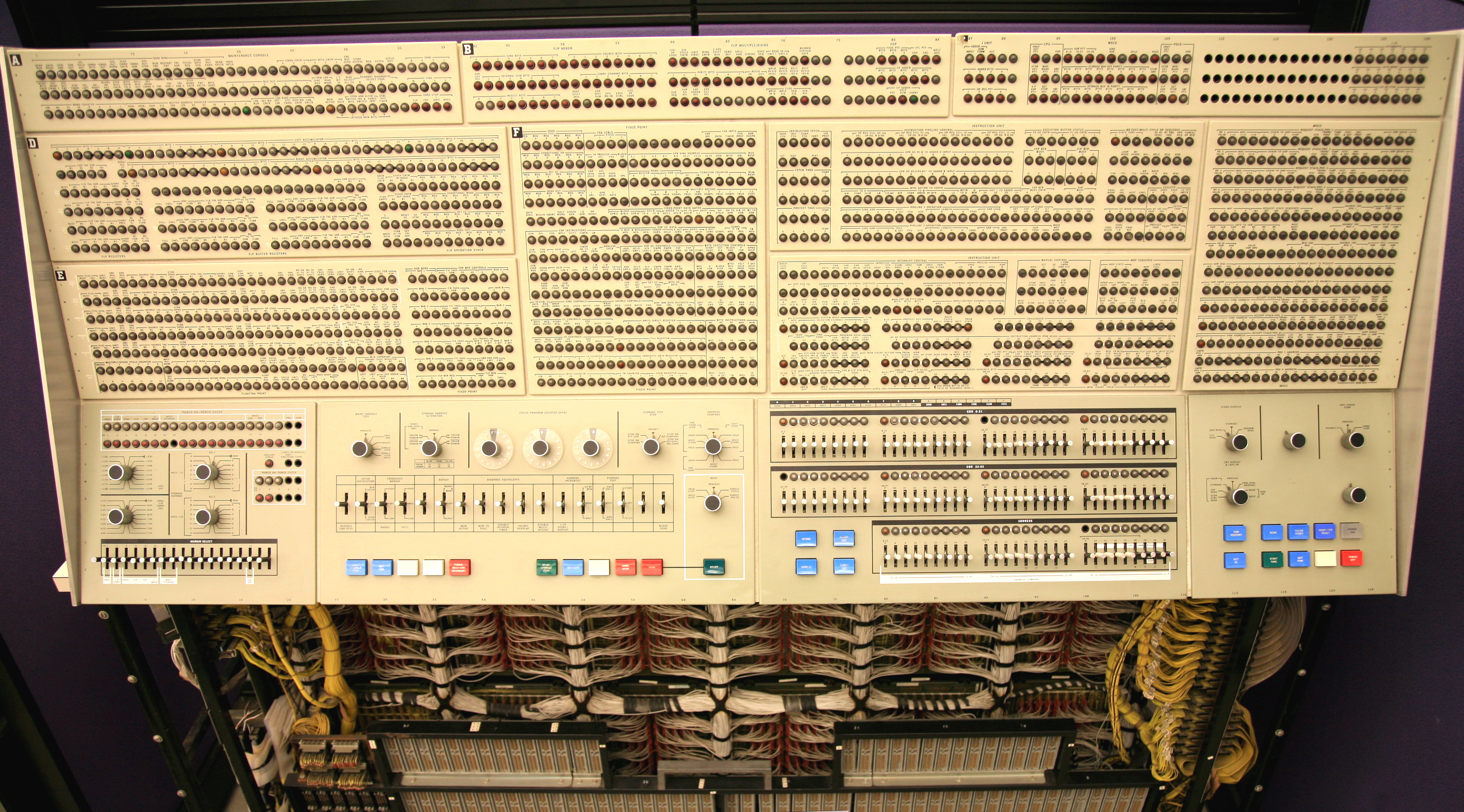
Model 91

== See also ==
- IBM System/360 architecture
- IBM System/370 architecture
- IBM 9370
- IBM System/370-XA
- IBM Enterprise Systems Architecture
- z/Architecture
- IBM 9020
- History of IBM
- List of IBM products
- IBM System/4 Pi
- Gerrit Blaauw
- Bob O. Evans
