= IBM System/360 Model 44 =

Specialized IBM computer model from 1960s

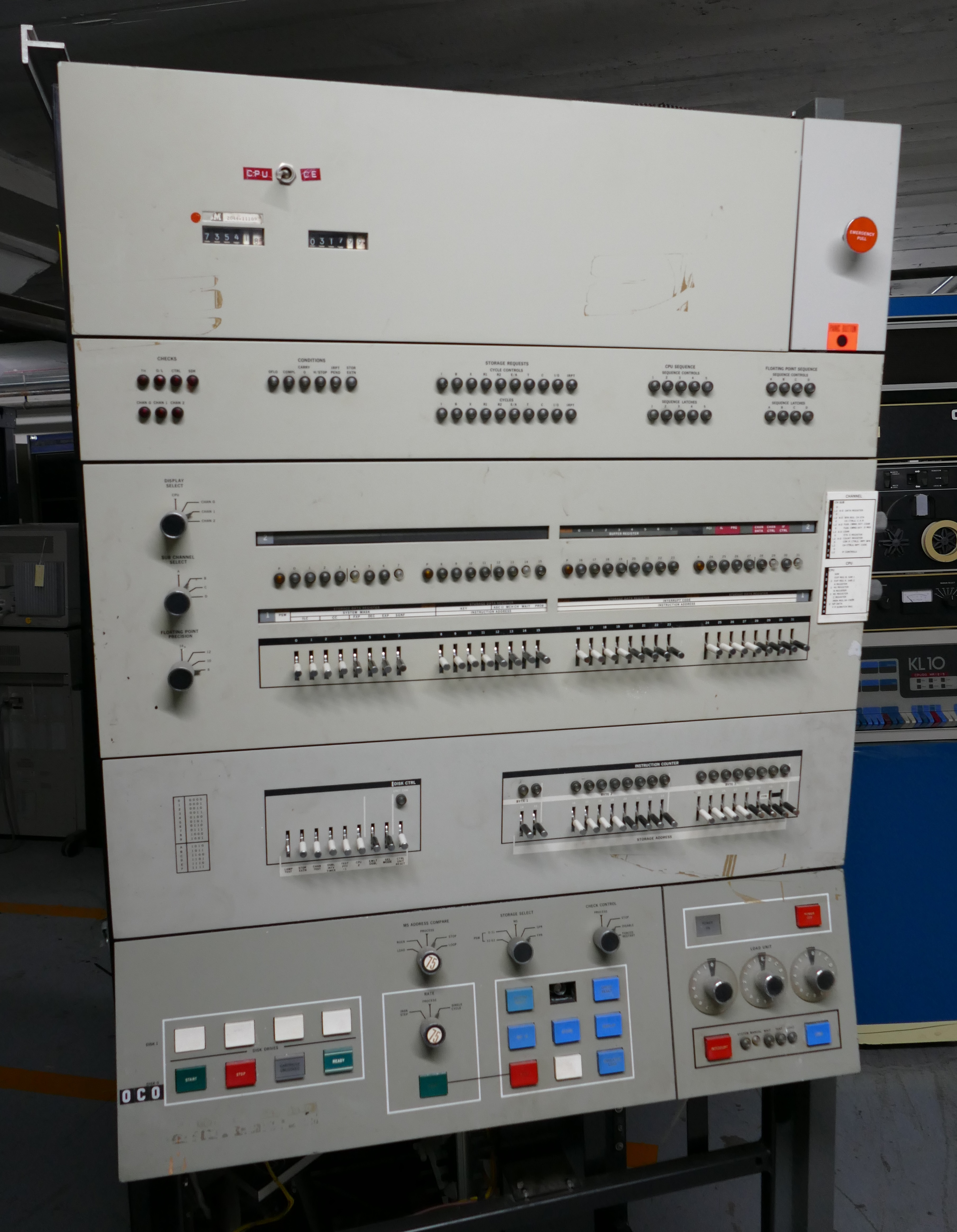
- System/360 Model 44 front panel
- Manufacturer: International Business Machines Corporation (IBM)
- Product family: System/360
- Released: August 16, 1965
- Discontinued: September 23, 1973
- Memory: 32–256 KB Core

The IBM System/360 Model 44 is a specialized member of the IBM System/360 family, with a variant of the System/360 computer architecture, designed for scientific computing, real-time computing, process control and numerical control (NC). (Note: An example of using a 360/44 for numerical control (NC) can be found at http://www.gao.gov/assets/400/393980.pdf.)

The Model 44 was announced August 16, 1965 and withdrawn September 24, 1973.

== Architecture ==
The base Model 44 lacks the storage-to-storage character and decimal instruction sets of a standard System/360, however an "extended instruction set" feature was available to provide the missing instructions. The machine features four unique instructions: Change Priority Mask (CHPM), Load PSW Special (LPSX), Read Direct Word (RDDW), and Write Direct Word (WRDW).

The system comes in four memory sizes: E (32 KiB), F (64 KiB), G (128 KiB), and H (256 KiB), with an access time of 1 μs, which puts it closer to the Model 65 (.75 μs) than the Model 50 (2.0 μs). Storage protection is an optional feature.

General-purpose registers are normally located in a non-addressable portion of 1 μs core storage termed "bump storage". For added speed, the general-purpose registers can be implemented in Solid Logic Technology (SLT) circuitry with an access time of .25 μs.

A unique feature of the Model 44 is "variable-length precision floating point arithmetic". It has the same short floating-point instructions and long floating-point instructions as the other models in the System/360 line, but it also has a rotary switch on the front panel which can be used to set the precision of long floating-point numbers. The mantissa portion of long floating-point numbers can be chosen as 32, 40, 48, or 56 bits, with 56 bits being the standard value. Whatever the setting, long floating-point numbers still occupy 64 bits in memory (the first eight bits are the sign and the exponent); the setting only leads, when it was less than 56 bits, to long floating-point operations ignoring some of the least significant bits of these numbers. This provides an improvement in speed when greater precision is not needed.

An optional feature provides six external interrupt lines.

The direct word feature allows the transfer of a full 32-bit word of information between an external device and main storage. This differs from the standard System/360 direct control feature which transfers a single byte. The Write Direct Word instruction places the contents of a word in memory as static signals on the 32 direct-out lines and uses the I_{2} field of the instruction as up to eight timing pulses. The Read Direct Word reads the 32 direct-in lines into memory and sends the I_{2} field as timing pulses.

Write Direct Word ('B4'x): WRDW D_{1}(B_{1}),I_{2}

Read Direct Word ('B5'x): RDDW D_{1}(B_{1}),I_{2}

The direct data channel feature provides a fast, simple data transfer capability. Controlled by standard System/360 I/O instructions and commands, it allows the connection of external devices that perform word-by-word data transfers with the Model 44 CPU at transfer rates up to 4 MiB/s.

The priority interrupt feature adds thirty-two interrupt levels to the standard five. This uses locations '800'x to '9FF'x for the old and new program status word locations. An eight-bit interrupt description from the interrupting device is stored in bit positions 24 to 31 of the corresponding old PSW. Bits 16-23 of the new PSW are used as a mask which is XORed with the interrupt description to modify the address from the new PSW, effectively allowing indexing into a jump table for the interrupt according to data sent by the device. The interrupts are numbered from 0 (highest priority) to 31 (lowest); a higher-priority interrupt can interrupt processing of a lower-priority interrupt. A 32- bit Priority Mask Register, set by the Change Priority Mask instruction, can be used to selectively mask interrupts to keep them in pending status until the mask is reset. The instruction can enable levels tagged by 1 bits, disable levels tagged by 0 bits cancel levels tagged by 1 bits, or cancel and enable levels tagged by 1 bits depending on the value of the I_{2} field. The Load PSW Special instruction is used to exit an interrupt routine resume the next highest priority routine or non-interrupt code.

Load PSW Special ('B2'x): LPSX D_{1}(B_{1}),I_{2}
I_{2} is reserved and should be zero.

Change Priority Mask ('B3'x): CHPM D_{1}(B_{1}),I_{2}
The high-order two bits of the I_{2} field are called the mask bit and the cancel bit.
The remainder of the I_{2} field is reserved and should be zero.

 (mask bit) (cancel bit) Function
    1            0       Enable levels tagged by 1 bits
    0            0       Disable levels tagged by 0 bits
    0            1       Cancel levels tagged by 1 bits
    1            1       Cancel and enable levels tagged by 1 bits

== Peripherals ==
The Model 44 can support up to one standard and two high-speed System/360 multiplexer channels in addition to integrated adapters for the single disk storage and the console 1052 printer/keyboard.

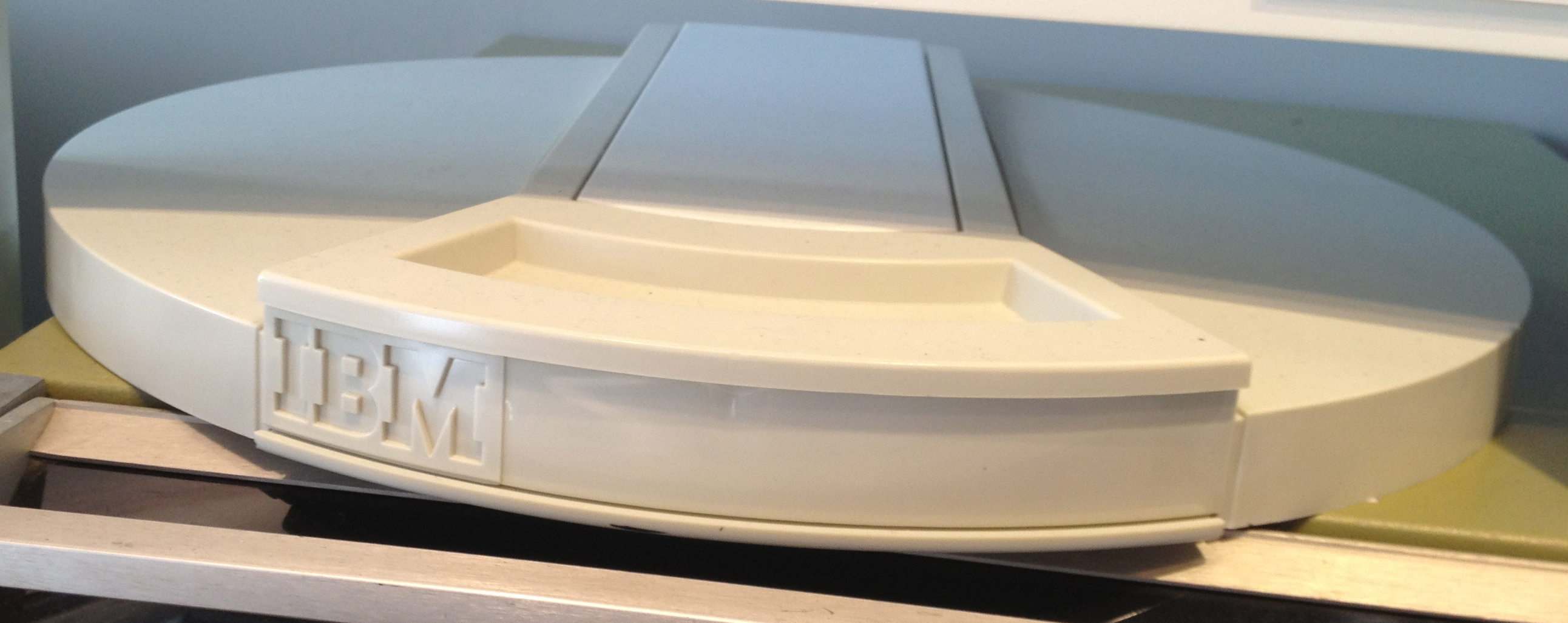
IBM 2315 disk cartridge

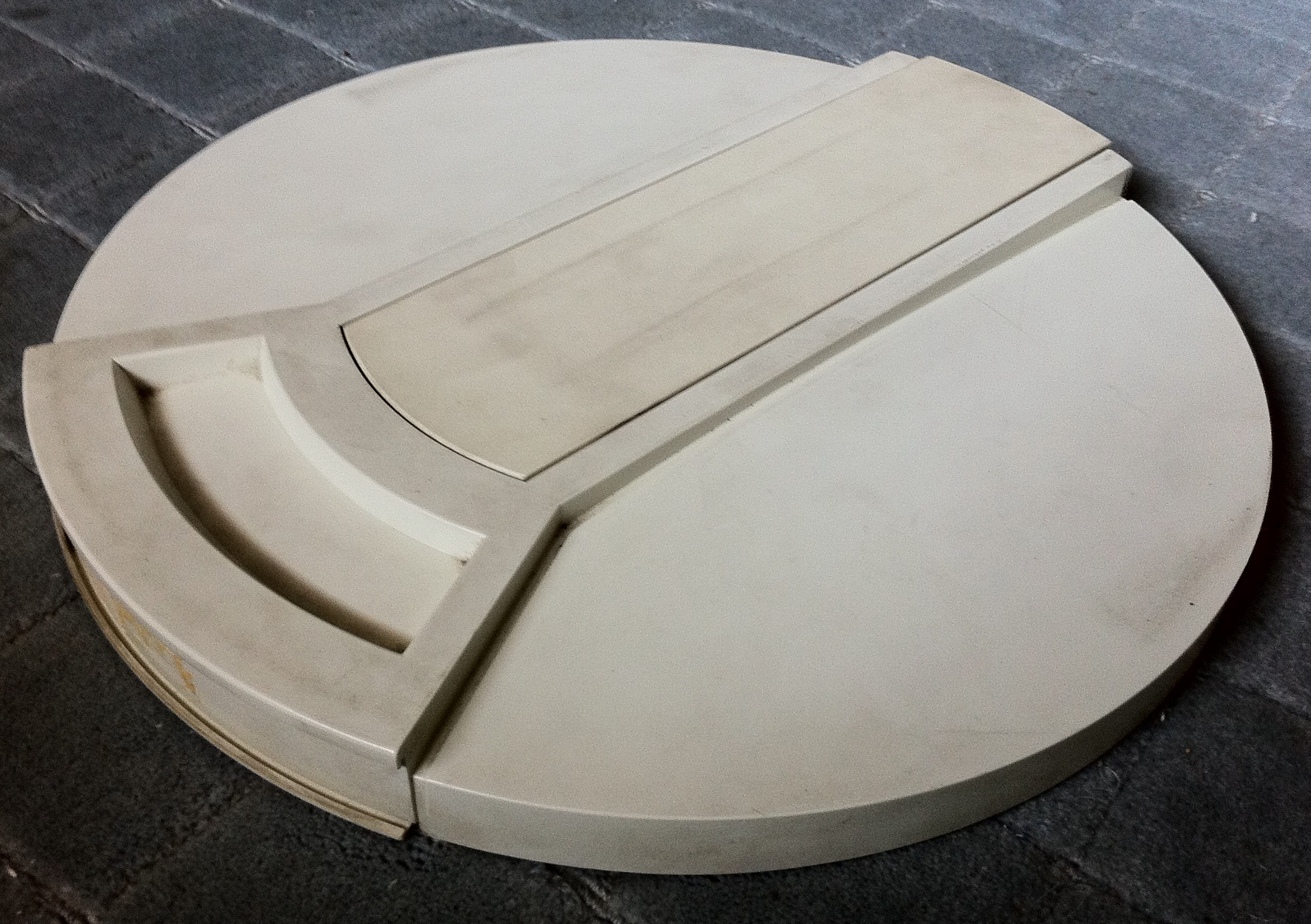
2315 compatible cartridge, top view

A unique feature of the Model 44 is its integrated single disk storage drive which uses the IBM 2315 cartridge and provides 1,171,200 bytes of removable disk storage built right into the CPU. A second integrated drive is available as an option. The Model 44 Programming System (M44PS) uses this drive as a systems residence device.

== Software ==
The Model 44 Programming System software includes a supervisor, utility programs, assembler, FORTRAN IV compiler, and a library of scientific subroutines.
