= IBM 2361 Large Capacity Storage =

Optional memory for larger IBM System/360 models

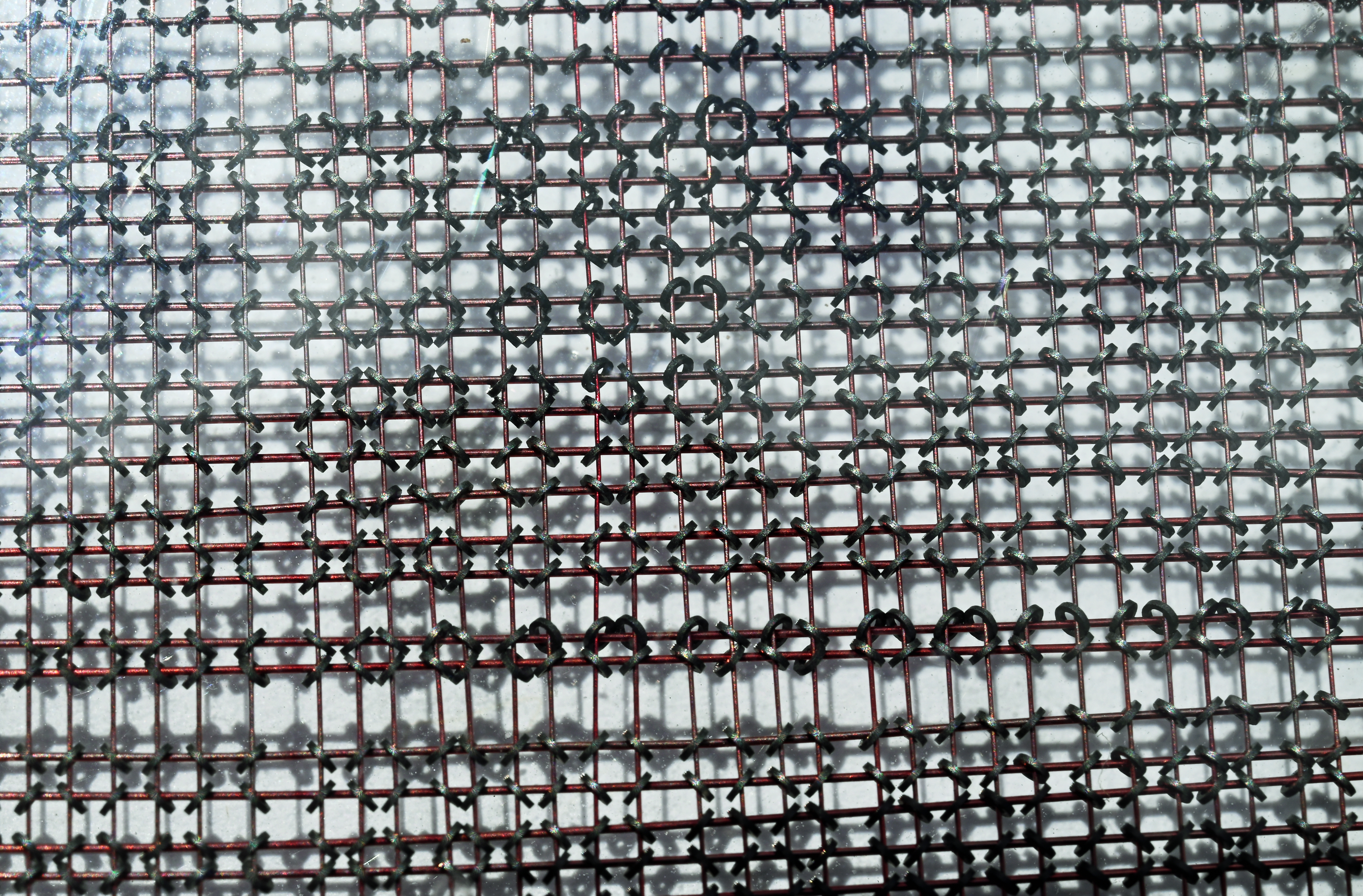
Magnetic core memory from a 2361 LCS, woven by hand

The IBM 2361 Large Capacity Storage (LCS) is an optional component of the IBM System/360 models 50, 65 (when not being used as a multiprocessor), and 75 computers. Storage is implemented using magnetic cores; the cycle time is 8 microseconds and the access time is 3.6 microseconds. This component is also called IBM 2361 Core Storage or IBM 2361 Large Core Storage. It provides additional main storage with a slower access time than the standard storage of the machine—for example 8 microseconds compared to 750 nanoseconds for main storage on the Model 65.

The IBM 2361 was also provided to NASA for use on their IBM 7094 real-time system, where it supplied 524,000 36-bit words of additional memory.

== Description ==
There are two models of the IBM 2361: model 1 has 1,048,576 bytes (1 MB) and model 2 has 2,097,152 bytes (2 MB). The model 2 contains 64 core planes of 32 KB each, the largest core planes ever manufactured.

The IBM 2361 can be shared between two System/360 computers. When sharing is between two model 50s, two model 65s, two model 75s, or a model 65 and a model 75, the two systems must have the same amount of main storage. When one of the sharing systems is a model 50 and the other a model 65 or model 75, the model 50 may have less main storage than the model 65 or model 75.

If a system contains an even number of IBM 2361 components and at least one model 65 or model 75 processor, the IBM 2361s can be interleaved to improve sequential access time. With interleaving, the first 64-bit word is contained in the first IBM 2361, the second in the second, the third in the first, and so forth. When doing sequential access, one IBM 2361 can complete its cycle while the other IBM 2361 is starting the next cycle.

Systems can incorporate either one 2361 model 1 or four Model 2s in non-interleave mode, or two Model 1s or four Model 2s in interleave mode, providing up to 8 MB of additional storage—a large amount when the Model 75J supports only 1 MB of processor storage.

== Software support ==
OS/360 allows the user to request memory in either processor storage ("hierarchy 0") or the slower LCS ("hierarchy 1"). The JOB or EXEC statement allows two specifications for region size: REGION=(VALUE1,VALUE2), where VALUE1 specifies the amount of processor storage in Kbytes, and VALUE2 specifies the amount of LCS storage. Some system macro instructions allow a programmer to specify use of storage in either hierarchy 0 or 1. The ATTACH, DCB, GETMAIN, GETPOOL, LINK, LOAD, and XCTL macros provide a (HIARCHY=n) parameter for this purpose (n=0 or 1). The OS/360 linkage editor also provides a HIARCHY control statement to assign specific control sections to a particular hierarchy, thus a program can be split into sections to run in processor storage and sections to run in LCS. Presumably large and little-used parts of a program could be marked to be loaded into LCS.
