= IBM System/360 Model 195 =

High-end IBM computer model from 1970s

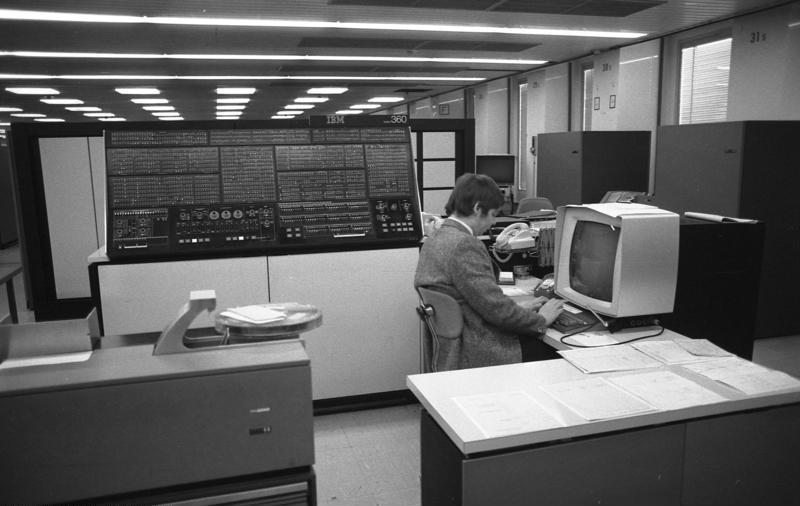
- Developer: IBM
- Released: August 20, 1969
- Introductory price: $7–12.5 million
- Discontinued: February 9, 1977
- Predecessor: IBM S/360 Model 91
- Successor: IBM S/370 Model 195

The IBM System/360 Model 195 is a discontinued IBM computer introduced on August 20, 1969. The Model 195 was a reimplementation of the IBM System/360 Model 91 design using monolithic integrated circuits. It offers "an internal processing speed about twice as fast as the Model 85, the next most powerful System/360". The Model 195 was discontinued on February 9, 1977, the same date as the System/370 Model 195.

About 20 Model 195 systems were produced.

== Technical specifications ==
The basic CPU cycle time is 54 nanoseconds (ns). The system has a high degree of parallelism and can process up to seven operations at a time. The system can be configured with 1, 2, or 4 MB of magnetic core memory (models 195J, 195K, and 195L) with a cycle time of 756 ns. A 32 KB cache, called a buffer memory in the IBM announcement, is standard. Memory blocks are brought into cache in units of 64 bytes.

The normal operating system for the Model 195 is OS/360 Multiprogramming with a Variable Number of Tasks (MVT).

== Components ==
The 360/195 has the following components:

- 2160 Model l System Console
- 2180 CPU Power Unit (Note: Model depends on configuration.)
- 2185 Power Distribution Unit
- 2186 Coolant Distribution Unit
- 2195 Processing Unit (which includes the Processor Storage)
- 2860 Selector Channel (Note: Optional, but there must be at least one channel.)
- 2870 Multiplexer Channel
- 2880 Block Multiplexer Channel

== Legacy ==
The Model 195 was later updated as the IBM System/370 Model 195 with the new System/370 instructions and the 370 time-of-day clock and control registers, but without the virtual memory hardware.
