= IBM System/370 Model 135 =

- Manufacturer: International Business Machines Corporation (IBM)
- Product family: System/370
- Released: March 8, 1971
- Discontinued: October 16, 1979

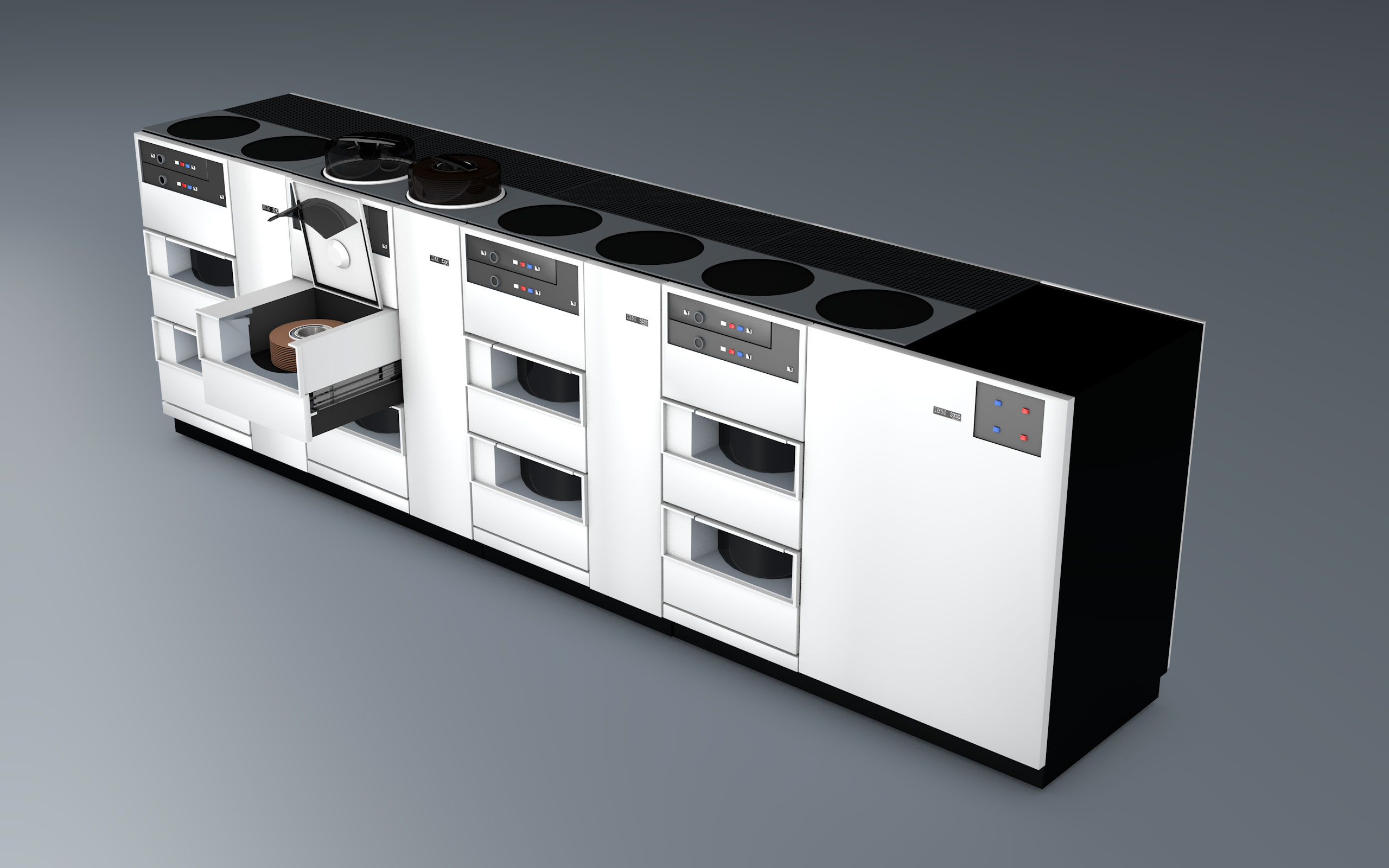
IBM 3330 "Expanded channel capacity and the ability to use the high-performance IBM 3330 disk storage under either Operating System (OS)or Disk Operating System (DOS) were ... among the factors significant to the Model 135's ...capabilities."

The IBM System/370 Model 135 was announced March 8, 1971, the only 370 introduced that year. The 135 was IBM's fifth System 370, and it was withdrawn October 16, 1979.

== Special features ==
Although microcode was not a uniquely new feature at the time of the 135's introduction, having been used in most System/360 models and in most System/370 models introduced so far, the ability to upgrade a system's microcode without changing hardware, by storing the microcode in read-write memory rather than read-only memory, was not common at that time.

The read-write memory containing the firmware was loaded from a "reading device located in the Model 135 console"; this allowed updates and adding features to the Model 135's microcode. The "reading device" was a built-in (read-only) floppy disk drive. The 145, introduced the prior year, also had this feature.

== Optional features ==
The Model 135 was the last of the 370s to be introduced without Virtual memory. Four of the five (Note: the 135, 145, 155 and 165, but not the 195) could be upgraded. Unlike the 155 & 165, which required an expensive (Note: $200,000 and $400,000 respectively) hardware upgrade to add a DAT box (Dynamic Address Translation), the 135 & 145 could obtain their virtual memory upgrades from a floppy disk.

Microcode upgrades were also available to add "user-selected options such as

- extended precision arithmetic or
- emulation of the IBM 1400 series." (Note: (1401, 1440 and 1460))

An upgraded Model 135 was termed a 370/135-3 (Note: and the upgrade could be done "in the field.")

Customers of the 370/135 had a choice of four main memory sizes, ranging from 96K to 256K.

== Other ==
- The 370/135 was introduced as running "under either OS or DOS. Newer versions thereof (DOS/VS and OS/VS1) and Virtual Machine Facility/370 (VM/370) subsequently became available options once the 135's microcode was upgraded to support virtual memory. This was priced at $120,000 and came with "increased reloadable control store in addition to some power units." The upgrade could be done "in the field" and the resultant system was now deemed a 370/135-3.
- The 135 was "partly developed at Hursley, UK."

=== Images ===
- System/370 Model 135 operator's console
- 370/135 with some peripherals

== See also ==
- List of IBM products
- IBM System/360
- IBM System/370
