= IBM System/360 Model 85 =

High-end IBM computer model from late 1960s

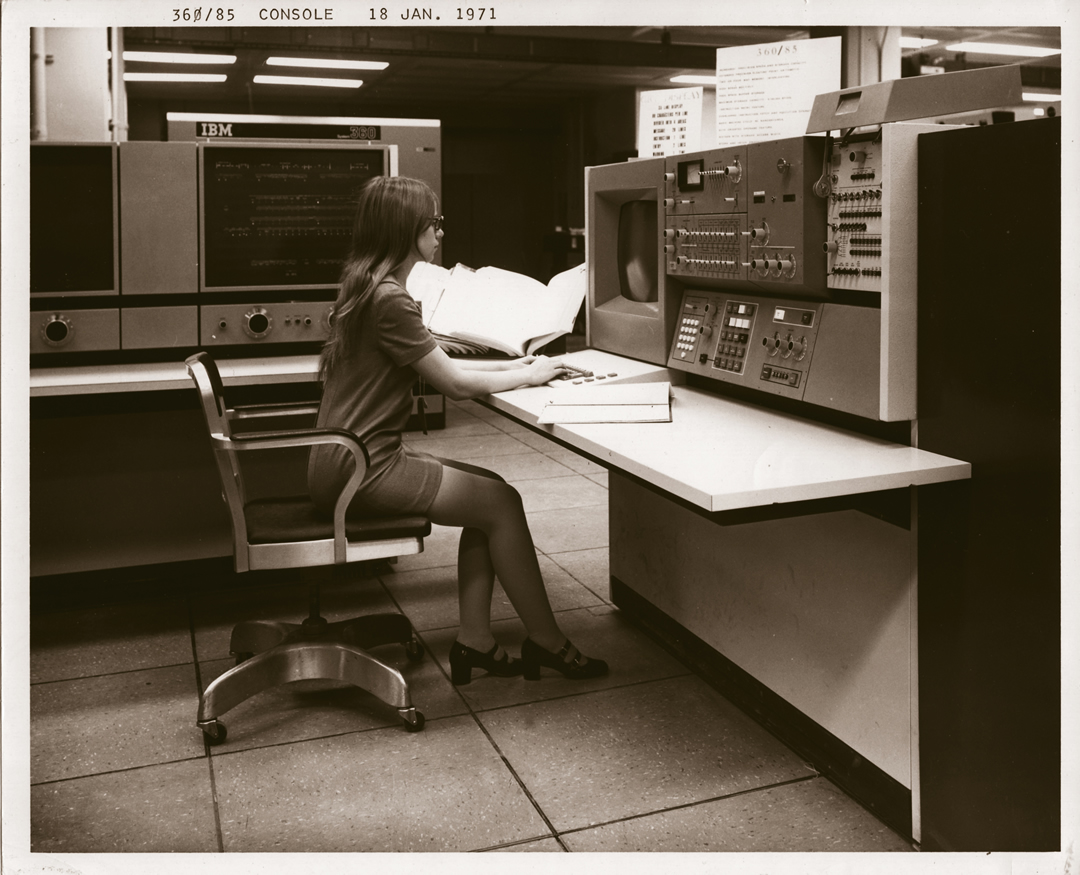
- IBM System/360 Model 85. View of system console. The left side has a Microfiche Document Viewer
- Manufacturer: International Business Machines Corporation (IBM)
- Product family: System/360
- Memory: 512 K - 4 M Core

The IBM System/360 Model 85 is a high-end member of the System/360 family of computers, with many advanced features, and was announced in January 1968 and first shipped in December 1969. IBM built only about 30 360/85 systems because of "a recession in progress".

== Models ==
The four models of the 360/85 are: I85 (512K), J85 (1M), K85 (2M) and L85 (4M), configured with two IBM 2365 Processor Storage units, four 2365 magnetic-core memory units, an IBM 2385 Processor Storage unit Model 1 (=2M), or an IBM 2385 Processor Storage unit Model 2 (=4M) respectively. The I85 includes two-way interleaved memory while the others provide four-way interleaving of memory access.

== Advanced/special features ==
- The system console is L-shaped: one leg is the Main Control Panel, including a CRT, and the other leg includes two screens: "Microfiche Document Viewer" and "Indicator Viewer."
- CPU cache, which IBM termed "high-speed buffer storage" - depending on the model and the situation, "the effective system storage cycle becomes one-third to one-fourth of the actual main storage cycle." The cache is high-speed, static buffer memory situated between the CPU and main system memory ("Level 1" cache), available in 16 KB and 32 KB size options. The System/360 Model 85 is the first commercially available computer with cache memory.
- Monolithic integrated circuits
- Enhanced floating point - The Model 85 comes with extended-precision 128-bit quadruple-precision floating point
- The Model 85 has both Read-only and Writeable Control Storage (it is the second System/360 to have writeable control storage; the IBM System/360 Model 25 is the first to have rewriteable control storage; the 360/85 was introduced Jan. 30, 1968).

== Emulation ==
The 360/85, when equipped with the 709/7090/7094 Compatibility Feature, with the use of an emulator program permits running 709, 7040, 7044, 7094 and 7094 II programs.

== Gateway to the future ==
In some respects, the System/360 Model 85 provided a glimpse into the future System/370 product line, particularly the IBM System/370 Model 165 which IBM announced two years later (1970). It used the MST circuitry that was later used in the initial System/370 models, and introduced features such as 128-bit floating-point arithmetic and block multiplexor channels that are also part of the System/370 architecture.

The 360/85 has a hardwired I-unit to fetch and decode instructions, but the E-unit uses microcode to control instruction execution, unlike the completely-hardwired 360/75 and 360/91; the high-end models of System/370 also use horizontal microcode, except for the IBM System/370 Model 195.
