= IBM 2365 Processor Storage =

Magnetic-core memory storage unit for IBM System/360 computers

The IBM 2365 Processor Storage is a magnetic-core memory storage unit that is a component of the IBM System/360 models 65, 67, 75 and 85 computers, which were released between 1965 and 1968.

Storage is implemented using magnetic cores with a storage width of 72 bits, which comprise 64 data bits (8 bytes, or one doubleword) plus 8 parity bits. The IBM 2365 model 1 contains 131,072 (128 K) bytes of memory; all other models contain 262,144 (256 K) bytes. The model 2 could be converted in the field to a model 13.

All models other than the model 1 consist of two memory stacks. Addressing for the stacks is interleaved, so the first 64-bit word is in one stack, the second in the other stack, and so forth. This improves performance when doing sequential access.

All models other than the model 5 have a cycle time of 750 nanoseconds.

== Models ==
The various models are used as follows:

- Model 1 is used on the System/360 model 65 when not used as a multiprocessor.
- Model 2 is used on the System/360 models 65 (when not used as a multiprocessor) and 67-1.
- Model 3 is used on the System/360 model 75.
- Model 5 is used on the System/360 model 85.
- Model 12 is used on the System/360 model 67-2.
- Model 13 is used on the System/360 model 65 when used as a multiprocessor.

== Use with the System/360 model 85 ==
The IBM 2365 model 5 is special because the System/360 model 85 accesses memory in 128-bit (16 byte) units, unlike the other System/360 models which support the IBM 2365, all of which access 64-bit (8 byte) units. On the System/360 model 85, the IBM 2365 model 5 operates with a cycle time of 1040 nanoseconds, and two or four of them are required. Because the System/360 model 85 CPU is so much faster than memory, if there are two IBM 2365 model 5 components they are two-way interleaved, and if there are four IBM 2365 model 5 components they are four-way interleaved. Because the IBM 2365 model 5 is internally two-way interleaved, sequential 128-bit memory operations issued by the System/360 model 85 CPU traverse all the memory components before cycling back to the first.

The IBM 2365 model 5 is used only with the System/360 model 85 with 524,288 (512 K) or 1,048,576 bytes (1 MB) of storage.

=== IBM 2385 Processor Storage ===
The IBM System/360 Model 85, when configured with 2,097,152 (2 MB, 360/85 K85) or 4,194,304 (4 MB, 360/85 L85) bytes, uses the IBM 2385 instead of the IBM 2365 Processor Storage. The IBM 2385 has a cycle time of 960 nanoseconds compared to 1,040 nanoseconds for the IBM 2365 model 5.
