= IBM System/370 Model 145 =

Mainframe computer by IBM in 1970

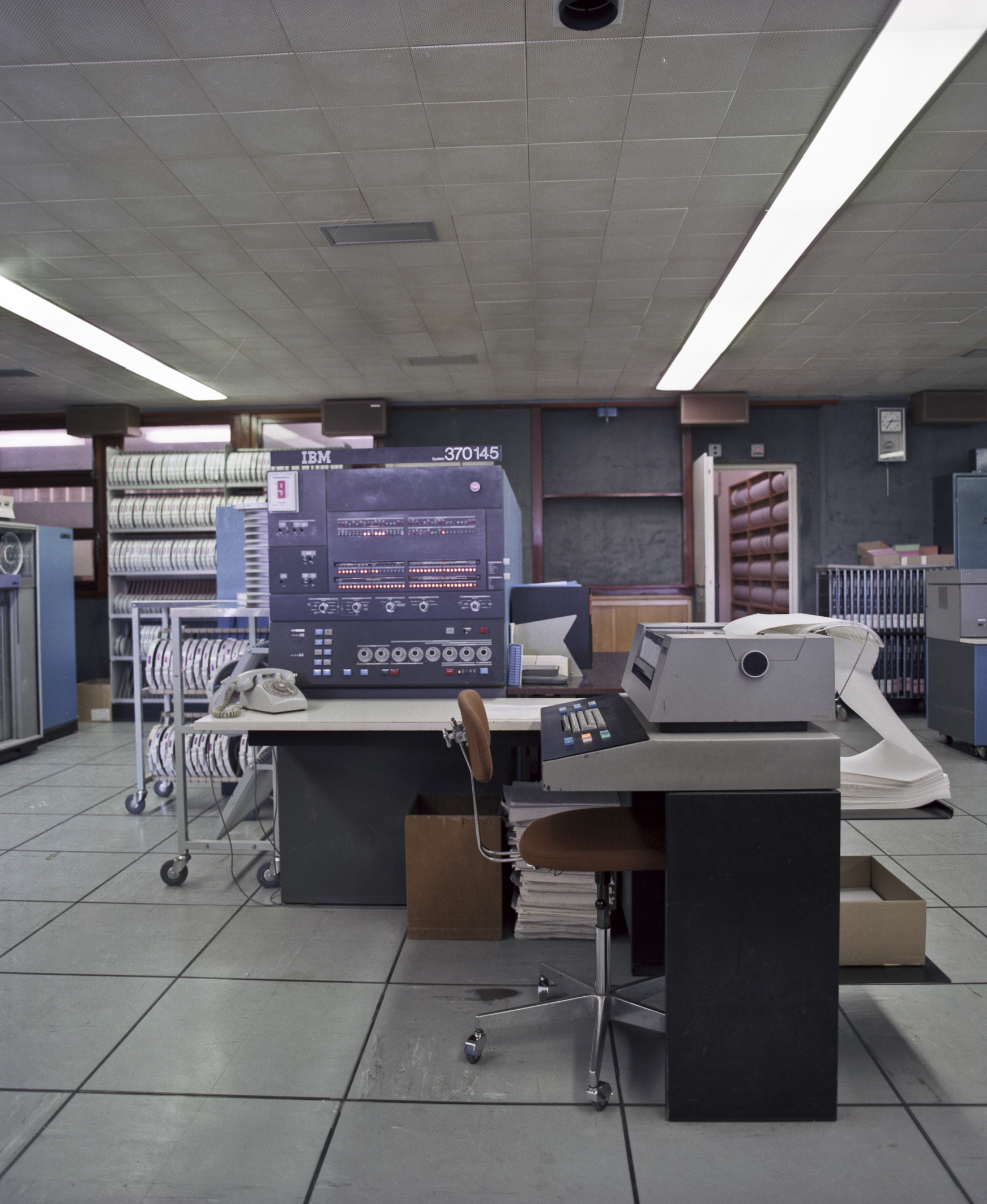
- IBM System/370 Model 145
- Manufacturer: International Business Machines Corporation (IBM)
- Product family: System/370
- Generation: Third
- Released: September 23, 1970
- Introductory price: $705,775 to $1,783,000
- Memory: semiconductor (first IBM use for main memory), 112–512 KB
- Storage: IBM 3330, IBM 2319
- Backward compatibility: IBM System/360, IBM 1400 series, IBM 7010
- Website: Official website IBM Archives

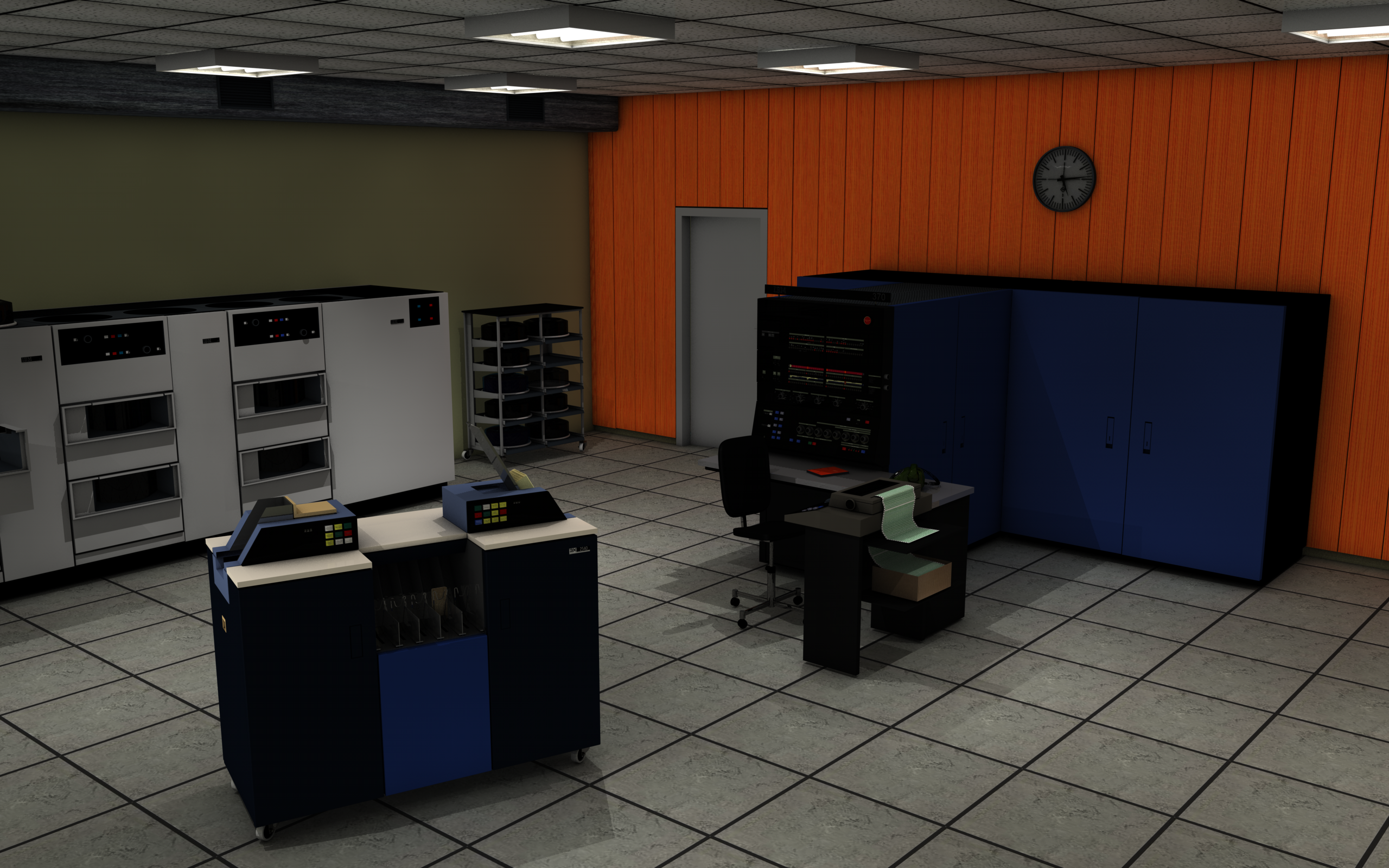
Render of S/370 Model 145 with typical peripherals

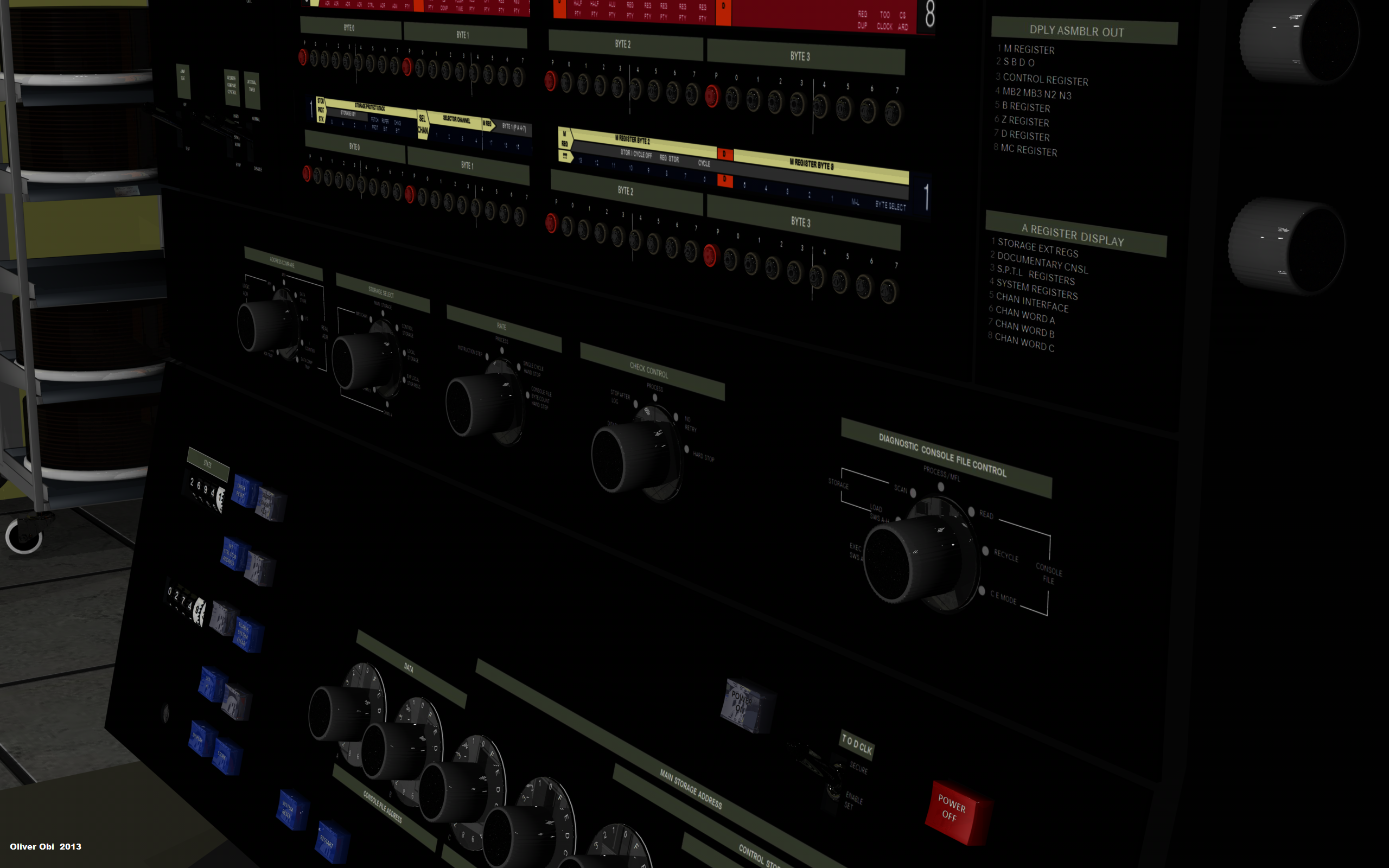
IBM System/370 Model 145 system console

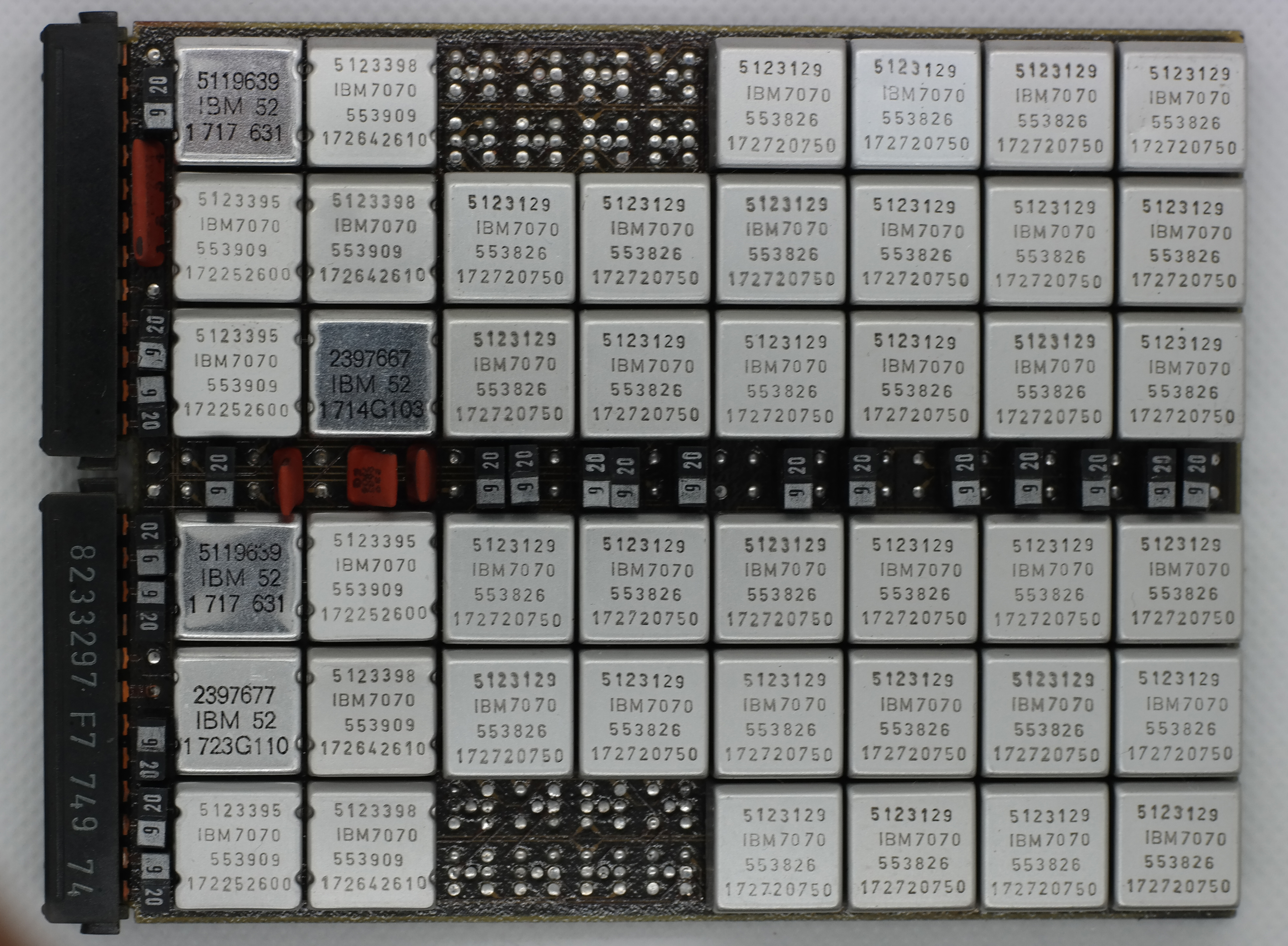
IBM monolithic memory card

The IBM System/370 Model 145 was announced September 23, 1970, three months after the 155 and 165 models. It was the fourth member of the IBM System/370 line of computers, (Note: A third 370, the 370/195, had separately been announced the same day as the 155 & 165.) and was the first IBM computer to use semiconductor memory for its main memory instead of magnetic core memory. It was described as being five times faster than the IBM System/360 Model 40. First shipments were scheduled for late summer of 1971.

== Virtual memory ==
Initially, the System/370 Model 145 did not support virtual memory.

Unlike the earlier Model 155 and 165 systems, for which an upgrade to virtual memory required the purchase of an expensive upgrade to add a DAT box, the Model 145 already included an associative memory used by the microcode for the DOS compatibility feature from its first shipments in June 1971; the same hardware was used by the microcode for DAT. Although IBM famously chose to exclude virtual storage from the S/370 announcement, that decision was being reconsidered during the completion of the 145 engineering, partly because of virtual memory experience at CSC and elsewhere. The 145 microcode architecture simplified the addition of virtual storage, allowing this capability to be present in early 145s without the extensive hardware modifications needed in other models. However, IBM did not document the 145's virtual storage capability, nor annotate the relevant bits in the control registers and PSW that were displayed on the operator control panel when selected using the roller switches. The Reference and Change bits of the Storage-protection Keys, however, were labeled on the rollers, a dead giveaway to anyone who had worked with the earlier 360/67. Existing S/370-145 customers were happy to learn that they did not have to purchase a hardware upgrade in order to run DOS/VS or OS/VS1 (or OS/VS2 Release 1 – which was possible, but not common because of the limited amount of main storage available on the S/370-145).

This resulted in two advantages of the 145 over the 155 and 165:

- 370/145 customers did not have to wait as long for this lack of virtual memory to be remedied (Note: June 1971 vs. Aug. 1972)
- there was no need to buy extra hardware: An upgrade to the 145's microcode through a new microcode floppy disk enabled virtual memory capability.

=== Operating systems ===
The 370/145 supported both DOS/360 and OS/360. Lacking virtual memory support, the 145, as announced, could not run a virtual memory operating system.

Upon gaining virtual memory capability via a microcode update, the 145 could now support the VMF (Virtual Machine Facility) and VM/CMS, a time-sharing system.

== See also ==
- List of IBM products
- IBM System/360
- IBM System/370
