= IBM System/370 Model 155 =

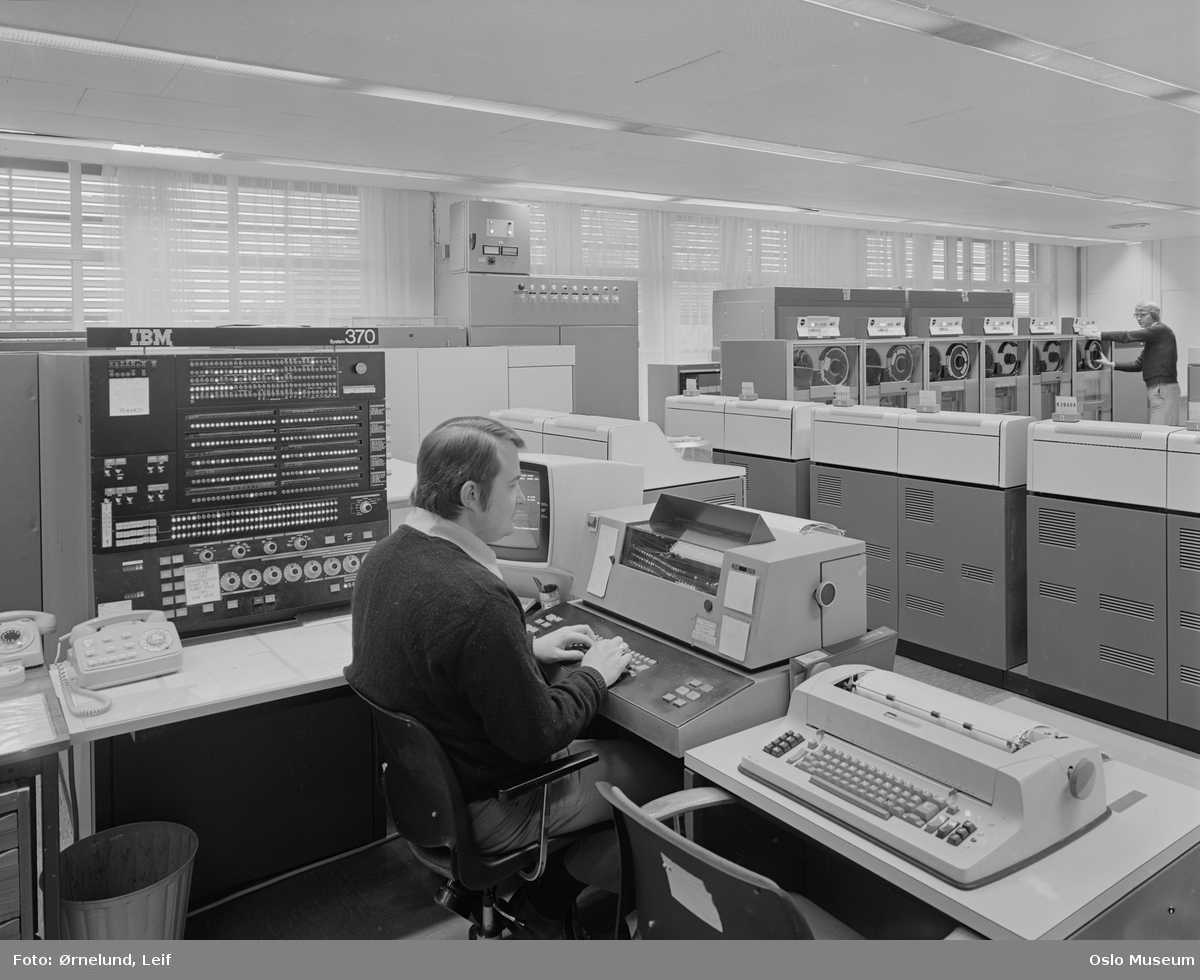
- IBM System/370 Model 155
- Manufacturer: International Business Machines Corporation (IBM)
- Product family: System/370
- Released: June 30, 1970
- Discontinued: December 23, 1977
- Website: Official website IBM Archives

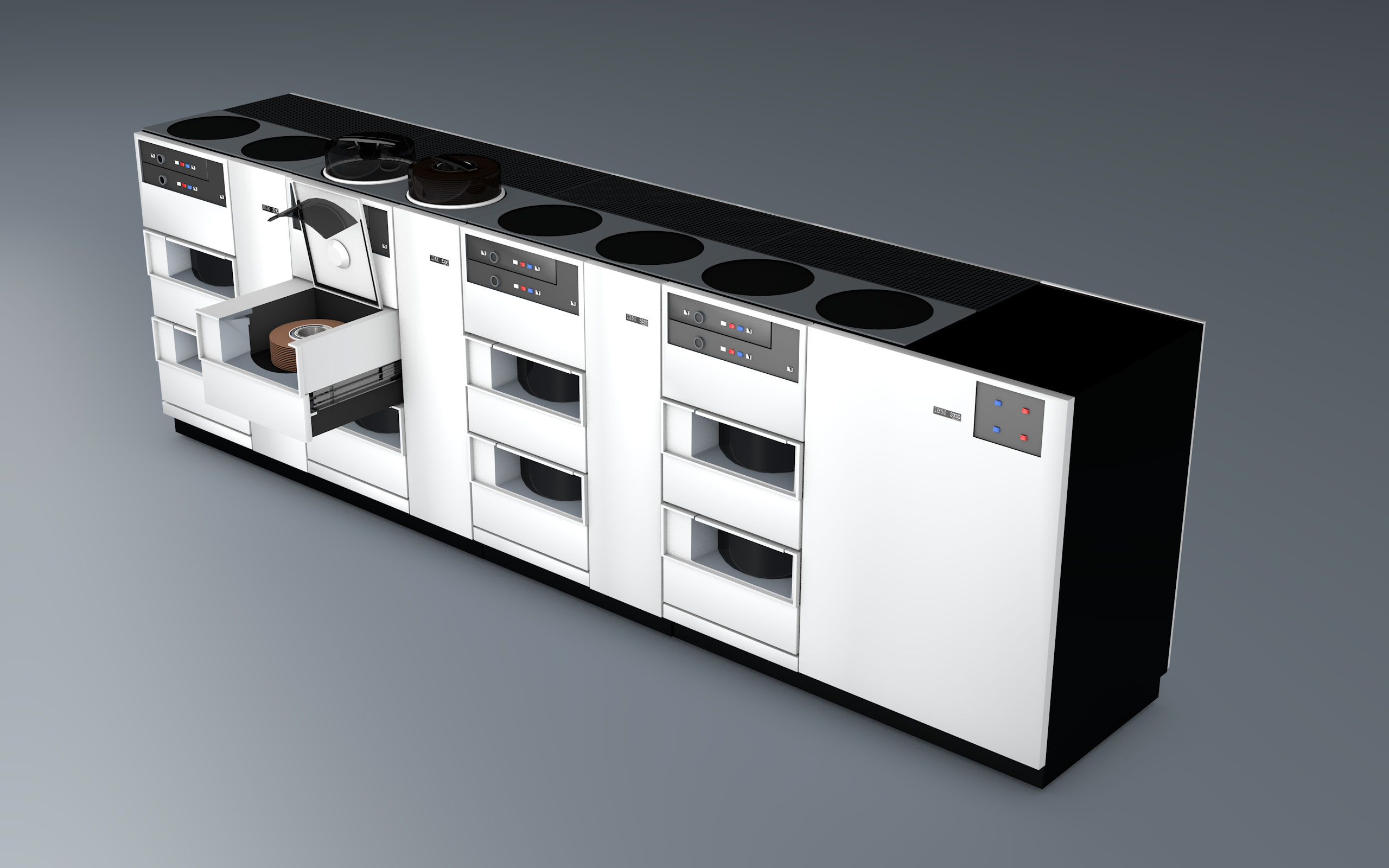
The IBM 3330 Direct Access Storage Facility, code-named Merlin, was introduced in June 1970 for use with the IBM System/370. Its removable disk packs could hold 100 MB

The IBM System/370 Model 155 (and the Model 165) were jointly announced Jun 30, 1970 as "designed for ... the Seventies." That same day IBM announced the 370/195. They were the first three models of the IBM System/370 line of computers.

Since none of them came with virtual memory, "which was to be a hallmark of the 370 line", some said about these early members of the IBM System/370 family, especially about the 155 and 165, that they were not "the real 370 line."

Three months later a fourth IBM System/370, the Model 145, was announced.

== Virtual memory ==
The initially announced System/370 Models 155 and 165 systems did not support virtual memory.

In 1972 an upgrade option was announced "to provide the hardware necessary to operate in a virtual memory mode." Unlike the IBM System/370 Model 145, which as early as June 1971 included the hardware necessary to support virtual memory, and for which a microcode update from a floppy disk, adding support for virtual memory, was announced in 1972, the Model 155 and Model 165 needed expensive hardware additions - $200,000 for the 155 and $400,000 for the 165 - to add virtual memory capability. An upgraded 155 was known as an IBM System/370 Model 155-II.

== Physical memory ==
Although the joint 155/165 announcement did not have the word virtual, there were multiple references to (physical) memory, storage (both main memory and disk storage), and cache memory under the name "buffer".

The 155 had seven main memory choices, ranging from 256 KB to 2 MB; the 165: five possibilities, from 512 KB to 3 MB. Both models were described as having "a very high-performance buffer storage backed by a large" main memory.

Another signs of not being "the real 370 line" is that the main storage in 3155 was not monolithic, it was using the older type of ferrite core storage. The 3360 storage unit could have 256 or 512 KB of storage, each 3155 could have one to four 3360 units attached. Also, the microcode in 3155 was "hardwired" while later 370 systems loaded the microcode from a floppy disk, enabling easy upgrades. The 3155 also had very limited error logging capability and used an IBM 3215 typewriter console.

== Channels ==
Channel 0 was a byte multiplexor channel, channel 1 to 5 were block multiplexor channels. Channel 0 and 1 were standard, channel 2 to 5 were optional upgrades.

== Operating systems ==
The 370/155 supported both DOS/360 and OS/360. Being members of the System/370 family, the Model 155 and Model 165 were compatible with each other. Lacking virtual memory support, neither machine, as announced, could run a virtual memory operating system.

A 370/155 upgraded to a 370/155-II, with support for virtual memory added, supported DOS/VS (DOS/360 with virtual storage), OS/VS1 (OS/360 MFT with virtual storage), OS/VS2 Release 1 (OS/360 MVT with virtual storage), termed SVS (Single Virtual Storage), and Release 2, termed MVS (Multiple Virtual Storage), and VM/370.

== See also ==
- List of IBM products
- IBM System/360
- IBM System/370
