= IBM System/360 Model 75 =

High-end IBM computer model from 1960s

- Developer: IBM
- Released: April 22, 1965
- Successor: Model 195

The IBM System/360 Model 75 is a discontinued high end/high performance system that was introduced on April 22, 1965. Although it played many roles in IBM's System/360 lineup, it accounted for a small fraction of a percent of the 360 systems sold. Five Model 75 computers housed at NASA's Real Time Computer Complex were used during the Apollo program.

== Models ==
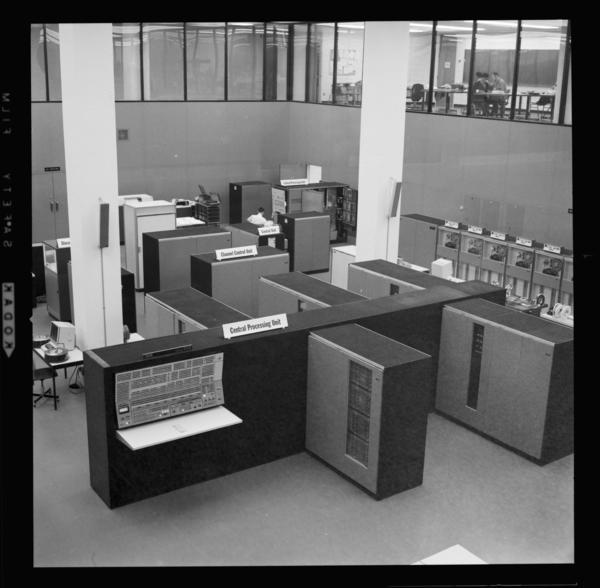
IBM System/360 Model 75 in the Mathematics and Computer Building at the University of Waterloo (1968)

Three models, the H75, I75, and J75, were respectively configured with one, two, or four IBM 2365 Model 3 Processor Storage units, each of which provided 262,144 (256K) bytes of core memory, so that the H75 had 262,144 (256K) bytes of core, the I75 had 524,288 (512K), and the J75 1,048,576 (1 MB).

The first model 75 was delivered to the NASA in January 1966.

== Performance ==
The high performance of the Model 75 was attributed to half a dozen advanced features, including parallel arithmetic, overlapped memory fetch, and parallel addition for address calculation.

Furthermore, independent storage sections provided two-way (H75) or four-way (I75, J75) interleaving of memory access. Even with only two-way interleaving, "an effective sequential access rate of 400 nanoseconds per double word (eight bytes) is possible".

== Features ==
The Model 75 implements the complete System/360 "universal instruction set" architecture, including floating-point, decimal, and character operations as standard features.
