= IBM System/370 Model 165 =

Type of mainframe computer

- Manufacturer: International Business Machines Corporation (IBM)
- Product family: System/370
- Released: June 30, 1970
- Discontinued: December 23, 1977
- Website: Official website IBM Archives

The IBM System/370 Model 165 (and the Model 155) were jointly announced June 30, 1970 as "designed for ... the Seventies." That same day IBM announced the 370/195. They were the first three models of the IBM System/370 line of computers.

Since none of them came with virtual memory, "which was to be a hallmark of the 370 line", some said about these early members of the IBM System/370 family, especially about the 165 and 155, that they were not "the real 370 line."

Three months later a fourth IBM System/370, the Model 145, was announced.

== Virtual memory ==
The initially announced System/370 Models 165 and 155 systems did not support virtual memory.

In 1972 an upgrade option was announced "to provide the hardware necessary to operate in a virtual memory mode." Unlike the IBM System/370 Model 145, which as early as June 1971 included the hardware necessary to support virtual memory, and for which a microcode update from a floppy disk, adding support for virtual memory, was announced in 1972, the Model 155 and Model 165 needed expensive hardware additions - $200,000 for the 155 and $400,000 for the 165 - to add virtual memory capability. An upgraded 165 was known as an IBM System/370 Model 165-II.

== Emulation ==
The 370/165, when equipped with the appropriate compatibility feature, with the use of an emulator program permits running

- 7070, 7072 and 7074 programs
- IBM 7080 programs
- 709, 7040, 7044, 7094 and 7094 II programs.

The IBM 7070/7074 Compatibility Feature allowed the 165 to "run 7070 and 7074 programs at speeds that, in general, equal or exceed those of the original systems" and yet "not affect normal operation of System/370."

== Physical memory ==
Although the joint 155/165 announcement did not have the word virtual, there were multiple references to (physical) memory, storage (both main memory and disk storage), and cache memory under the name "buffer".

The 155 had seven main memory choices, ranging from 256K to 2 MB; the 165: five possibilities, from 512K to 3 MB. Both models were described as having "a very high-performance buffer storage backed by a large" main memory.

== Operating systems ==
The 370/165 supported both DOS/360 and OS/360. Being members of the System/370 family, the Model 155 and Model 165 were compatible with each other. Lacking virtual memory support, neither machine, as announced, could run a virtual memory operating system.

IBM provided and supported the free operating systems DOS/VS (DOS/360 with virtual storage), OS/VS1 (OS/360 MFT with virtual storage), OS/VS2 Release 1 (OS/360 MVT with virtual storage), termed SVS (Single Virtual Storage), and Release 2, termed MVS (Multiple Virtual Storage), and Virtual Machine Facility/370 (VM/370) on a 370/165 upgraded to a 370/165-II, exploiting the virtual memory hardware. IBM also provided TSS/370 for the 165-II as a PRPQ, while others ported 3rd party operating systems, e.g., Michigan Terminal System (MTS), Orvyl, from the 360/67 to S/370s with virtual memory hardware.

== See also ==
- List of IBM products
- IBM System/360
- IBM System/370
