= List of IBM products =

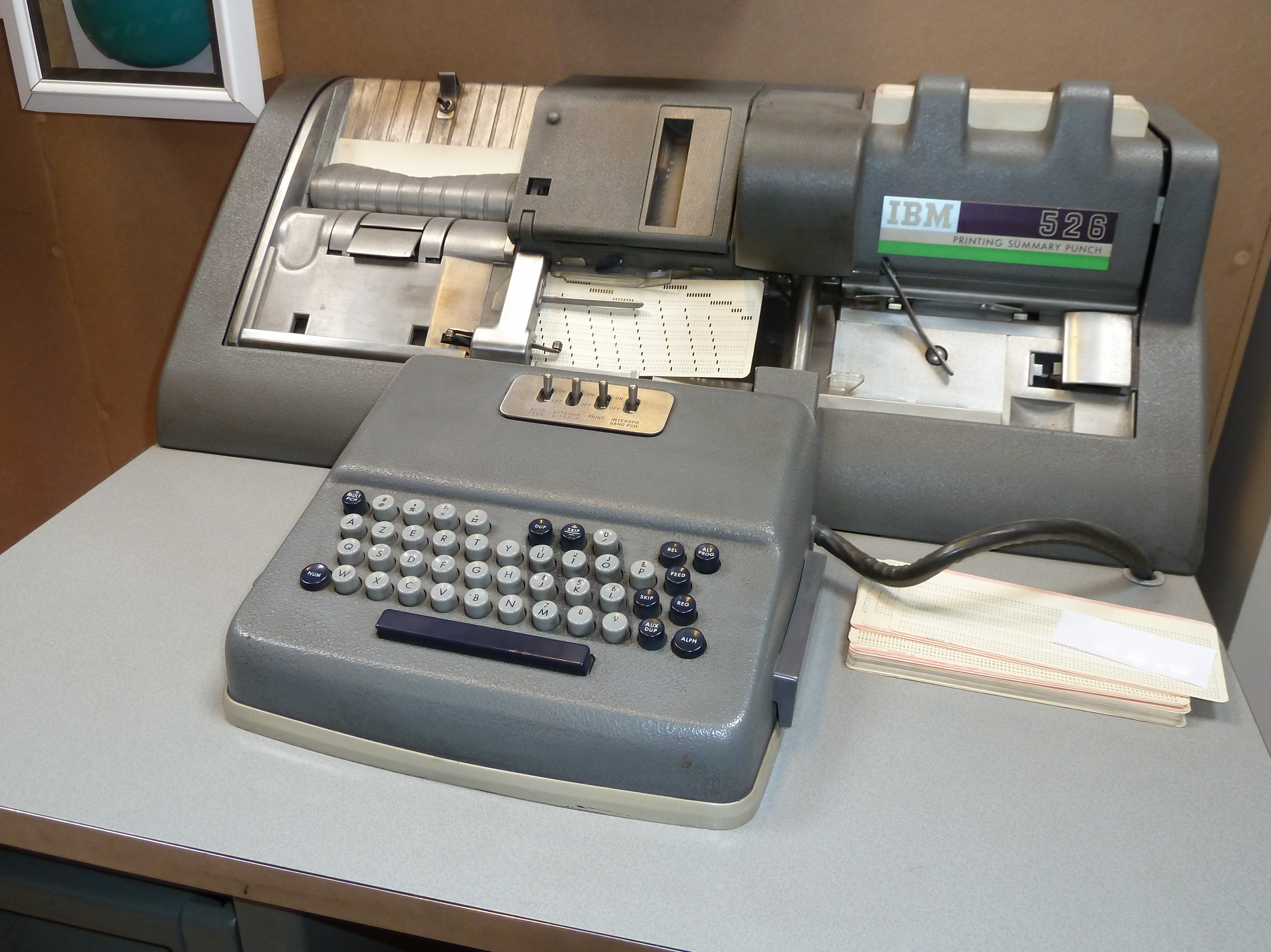
IBM 526 Printing Summary Punch, ca. 1948, with French keyboard layout

The list of IBM products is a partial list of products, services, and subsidiaries of International Business Machines (IBM) Corporation and its predecessor corporations, beginning in the 1890s.

== Context ==
Products, services, and subsidiaries have been offered from International Business Machines (IBM) Corporation and its predecessor corporations since the 1890s. This list comprises those offerings and is eclectic; it includes, for example, the AN/FSQ-7, which was not a product in the sense of offered for sale, but was a product in the sense of manufactured—produced by the labor of IBM. Several machines manufactured for the Astronomical Computing Bureau at Columbia University are included, as are some machines built only as demonstrations of IBM technology. Missing are many RPQs, OEM products (semiconductors, for example), and supplies (punched cards, for example). These products and others are missing simply because no one has added them.

IBM sometimes uses the same number for a system and for the principal component of that system. For example, the IBM 604 Calculating Unit is a component of the IBM 604 Calculating Punch. And different IBM divisions used the same model numbers; for example IBM 01 without context clues could be a reference to a keypunch or to IBM's first electric typewriter.

Number sequence may not correspond to product development sequence. For example, the 402 tabulator was an improved, modernized 405.

IBM uses two naming structures for its modern hardware products. Products are normally given a three- or four-digit machine type and a model number (it can be a mix of letters and numbers). A product may also have a marketing or brand name. For instance, 2107 is the machine type for the IBM System Storage DS8000. While the majority of products are listed here by machine type, there are instances where only a marketing or brand name is used. Care should be taken when searching for a particular product as sometimes the type and model numbers overlap. For instance the IBM storage product known as the Enterprise Storage Server is machine type 2105, and the IBM printing product known as the IBM Infoprint 2105 is machine type 2705, so searching for an IBM 2105 could result in two different products—or the wrong product—being found.

IBM introduced the 80-column rectangular hole punched card in 1928. Pre-1928 machine models that continued in production with the new 80-column card format had the same model number as before. Machines manufactured prior to 1928 were, in some cases, retrofitted with 80-column card readers and/or punches thus there existed machines with pre-1928 dates of manufacture that contain 1928 technology.

This list is organized by classifications of both machines and applications, rather than by product name. Thus some (few) entries will be duplicated. The 1420, for example, is listed both as a member of the 1401 family and as a machine for Bank and finance.

IBM product names have varied over the years; for example these two texts both reference the same product.

- Mechanical Key Punch, Type 1 (in Machine Methods of Accounting, IBM, 1936)
- Mechanical Punch, Type 001 (in IBM Electric Punched Card Accounting Machines: Principles of Operation, IBM, 1946)

This article uses the name, or combination of names, most descriptive of the product. Thus the entry for the above is

- IBM 001: Mechanical Key Punch

Products of The Tabulating Machine Company can be identified by date, before 1933 when the subsidiaries were merged into IBM.

== Unit record equipment ==
=== Keypunches and verifiers ===
- Hollerith Keyboard (pantograph) punch: Manual card punch, 1890
- IBM 001: Mechanical Key Punch, 1910
- IBM 003: Lever Set Gang Punch, 1920
- IBM 010: Card Punch
- IBM 011: Electric Key Punch, 1923
- IBM 012: Electric Duplicating Key Punch, 1926
- IBM 013: Badge Punch
- IBM 015: Motor Drive Key Punch, 1915
- IBM 016: Motor Drive Duplicating Key Punch, 1927
- IBM 020: Card Punch
- IBM 024: Card Punch (electronic—tube, BCD zone codes); 1949
- IBM 026: Printing Card Punch (electronic—tube, BCD zone codes); 1949
- IBM 027: Card Proof Punch, 1956
- IBM 028: Printing Card Proof Punch, 1956
- IBM 029: Card Punch (electric—diodes & relays, EBCDIC zone codes); 1964
- IBM 031: Alphabetic Duplicating Key Punch; 1933
- IBM 032: Alphabetic Printing Key Punch; 1933
- IBM 033: Alphabetic Duplicating Printing Punch
- IBM 034: Alphabetic Duplicating Printing Key Punch; 1933
- IBM 036: Alphabetic Printing Punch, 1930
- IBM 037: Alphabetic Stencil Punch
- IBM 040: Tape Controlled Card Punch; 1941
- IBM 041: Tape to Card Punch
- IBM 043: Tape Controlled Card Punch
- IBM 044: Tape Controlled Card Punch
- IBM 046: Tape-to-Card Punch
- IBM 047: Tape-to-Card Printing Punch
- IBM 051: Mechanical Verifier
- IBM 052: Motor Drive Verifier
- IBM 053: Motor Drive Verifier
- IBM 054: Motor Drive Verifier
- IBM 055: Alphabetic Verifier, 1946
- IBM 056: Card Verifier (electronic—tube, BCD zone codes); 1949
- IBM 058: Card Operated Typewriter
- IBM 059: Card Verifier (electric, diodes & relays, EBCDIC zone codes); 1964
- IBM 060: Card to Tape Punch (5 channel)
- IBM 063: Card-Controlled Tape Punch
- IBM Data Transceiver: A 65 or 66 in combination with a 67 or 68
  - IBM 065: Data Transceiver Card Unit
  - IBM 066: Data Transceiver Printing Card Unit
  - IBM 067: Telegraph Signal Unit for 065/066
  - IBM 068: Telephone Signal Unit for 065/066
- IBM 116: Numeric Duplicating Punch
- IBM 129: Card Data Recorder (integrated circuits—SLT, EBCDIC zone codes); 1971
- IBM 131: Alphabetic Duplicating Punch
- IBM 143: Tape Controlled Card Punch
- IBM 151: Verifier
- IBM 155: Numeric Verifier
- IBM 156: Alphabetic Verifier
- IBM 163: Card Controlled Tape Punch
- IBM 210: Electric Verifier
- IBM 797: Document Numbering Punch; 1951
- IBM 824: Typewriter Card Punch
- IBM 826: Typewriter Card Punch Printing
- IBM 884: Typewriter Tape Punch
- IBM 963: Tape Punch
- IBM 5471: Printer-Keyboard for System/3
- IBM 5475: Data Entry Keyboard for System/3
- IBM 5496: Data Recorder, Keypunch for IBM System/3's 96 column cards
- IBM 5924: IBM 029 attached with a special keyboard to allow input of Chinese, Japanese and Korean characters (RPQ)
- IBM Port-A-Punch: Port-A-Punch; 1958
- IBM Votomatic: Voting machine (Port-A-Punch balloting, 1965)

=== Sorters, statistical, and derived machines ===
- Hollerith automatic sorter: Horizontal sorter, 1901
- Hollerith 2: Card counting sorter
- IBM 70: Hollerith Vertical Sorter; 1908
- IBM 71: Vertical Sorter; 1928
- IBM 74: Printing Card Counting Sorter, 1930
- IBM 75: Card Counting Sorter
- IBM 76: Searching Sorter Punch
- IBM 80: Card Sorter, 1925
- IBM 81: Card Stencil Sorter
- IBM 82: Card Sorter, 1948
- IBM 83: Card Sorter, 1955
- IBM 84: Card Sorter, 1959
- IBM 86: Coupon Sorter
- IBM 101: Statistical Machine; 1952
  - IBM 524: Duplicating Summary Punch (Numerical card punch, features of an 016 and can also be connected to a 101)
- IBM 106: Coupon Statistical Machine
- IBM 108: Card Proving Machine; 196X
  - IBM 867: IBM 108 Output Typewriter
- IBM 109: Statistical Sorter
- IBM 5486: Card Sorter for IBM System/3's 96 column cards
- IBM 9900: Continuous Multiple Access Comparator

=== Collators ===
- IBM 072: Alphabetic Collator
- IBM 077: Electric Punched Card Collator; 1937
- IBM 078: Stencil Collator
- IBM 079: Stencil Printing Collator
- IBM 085: Numerical Collator; 1957
- IBM 087: Alphabetic Collator
- IBM 088: Numerical Collator
- IBM 089: Alphabetic Collator
- IBM 188: Alphabetic Collator

=== Reproducing punch, summary punch, gang punch, and derived machines ===
- IBM 501: Automatic Numbering Gang Punch
- IBM 511: Automatic Reproducing Punch
- IBM 512: Reproducing Punch, 1940
- IBM 513: Reproducing Punch, 1945
- IBM 514: Reproducing Punch
- IBM 515: Interpreting Reproducing Punch
- IBM 516: Automatic Summary Punch
- IBM 517: Gang Summary Punch, 1929
- IBM 518: Gang Summary Punch, 1929
- IBM 519: End Printing Reproducing Punch, 1946
- IBM 520: Computing Punch
- IBM 522: Duplicator Summary Punch
- IBM 523: Gang Summary Punch; 1949
- IBM 524: Duplicating Summary Punch (Numerical card punch, features of an 016 and up to 2 can also be connected to a 101)
- IBM 526: Printing Summary Punch (electronic, BCD zone codes, "an 026 arranged for summary punching")
- IBM 528: Accumulating Reproducer
- IBM 534: Card Punch (connects to 870, 108, 1230, 1232)
- IBM 545: Output Punch (an 029 plus connector)
- IBM 549: Ticket Converter

=== Interpreters ===
- IBM 548: Interpreter
- IBM 550: Numerical Interpreter, 1935
- IBM 551: Automatic Check Writing Interpreter, 1935
- IBM 552: Alphabetic Interpreter
- IBM 554: Interpreter
- IBM 555: Alphabetic Interpreter
- IBM 556: Interpreter
- IBM 557: Alphabetic Interpreter
- IBM 938: Electrostatic Card Printer

=== Tabulators, accounting machines, printers ===
- Hollerith Census Tabulator: 1890
- Hollerith Integrating Tabulator: 1896
- Hollerith Automatic Feed Tabulator: 1900
- IBM 090: Hollerith Type I Tabulator, 1906
- IBM 091: Hollerith Type III Tabulator, 1921
- IBM 092: Electric Tabulating Machine(first Plugboard, later known as a Control Panel)
- IBM 093: Automatic Control Tabulator, 1914(2 sets of reading brushes, STOP cards not needed)
- Hollerith Type 3-S Tabulator: 192x
- IBM 094: Non-print Automatic Checking Machine
- IBM 211: Accounting Machine
- IBM 212: Accounting Machine
- IBM 285: Electric Accounting Machine; 1927
- IBM 297: Numerical Accounting Machine
- IBM 298: Numerical Accounting Machine
- IBM 301: Hollerith Type IV Tabulator, 1928
- IBM 375: Invoicing Tabulator
- IBM Direct Subtraction Accounting Machine:
- IBM ATB: Alphabetic Tabulating model B; 1931
- IBM ATC: Alphabetic Tabulating model C; 1931? (soon after the ATB)
- IBM 401: Tabulator; 1933
- IBM Electromatic Table Printing Machine: Typesetting-quality printer; 1946

402 and known versions

- IBM 402: Alphabetic Accounting Machine 1948
- IBM 402: Computing Accounting Machine (with solid-state computing device)
- IBM 403: Alphabetic Accounting Machine, 1948(MLP—multiple line printing)(version of 402)
- IBM 403: Computing Accounting Machine (with solid-state computing device)(version of 402)
- IBM 412: Accounting Machine (version of 402)
- IBM 417: Numerical Accounting Machine (version of 402)
- IBM 419: Numerical Accounting Machine(version of 402)
  - IBM 513, 514, 517, 519, 523, 526, 528, or 549: Summary punch for 402
  - IBM 916: Bill Feed for 402(single sheet feed)
  - IBM 923: Tape-Controlled Carriage for 402
  - IBM 924: Dual Feed Tape Carriage for 402
  - IBM 1997: Tape-Controlled Bill Feed 402

404

- IBM 404: Accounting Machine

405 and known versions

- IBM 405: Alphabetic Bookkeeping and Accounting Machine; 1934 (later: 405 Electric Punched Card Accounting Machine)
- IBM 416: Numerical Accounting Machine (version of 405)
  - IBM 514, 519, 523, 526, 528, 549: Summary punch for 405
  - IBM 921: International Automatic Carriage for 405, 416 (1938)

407 and known versions

- IBM 407: Alphabetic Accounting Machine; 1949
- IBM 407: Computing Accounting Machine (with solid-state computing device)
- IBM 408: Alphabetic Accounting Machine, 1957(version of 407)
- IBM 409: Accounting Machine; 1959 (version of 407)
- IBM 421: WTC Computing Accounting Machine (with solid-state computing device)(version of 407)
- IBM 444: Accounting Machine(version of 407)
- IBM 447: WTC Computing Accounting Machine (with solid-state computing device)(version of 407)
  - IBM 514, 519, 523, 528, 549: Summary punch for 407
  - IBM 922: Tape-Controlled Carriage for 407
- IBM 418: Numerical Accounting Machine
- IBM 420: Alphabetical Accounting Machine
- IBM 424: WTC Computing Accounting Machine (with solid-state computing device)
- IBM 426: Accounting Machine
- IBM 427: WTC Accounting Machine (for instance, suitable for British £sd currency)
- IBM 450: Accounting Machine
- IBM 632: Accounting Machine
- IBM 850: Stencil Cutter
- IBM 856: Card-A-Type
- IBM 857: Document Writer
- IBM 858: Cardatype Accounting Machine, 1955
  - IBM 534: IBM 858 Card Punch (similar to 024)
  - IBM 536: IBM 858 Printing Card Punch (similar to 026)
  - IBM 858: IBM 858 Control Unit
  - IBM 863: IBM 858 Arithmetic Unit
  - IBM 866: IBM 858 Non-Transmitting Typewriter
  - IBM 868: IBM 858 Transmitting Typewriter
  - IBM 961: IBM 858 8-channel Tape Punch
  - IBM 962: IBM 858 5-channel Tape Punch
  - IBM 972-1: IBM 858 Auxiliary Keyboard for Manual Entry—Twelve columns of keys*
- IBM 861: Stencil Charger
- IBM 869: Typewriter
- IBM 870: Document Writing System
  - IBM 834: IBM 870 Control Unit
  - IBM 836: IBM 870 Control Unit
  - IBM 865: IBM 870 Output typewriters
  - IBM 866: IBM 870 Non-transmitting Typewriter
  - IBM 868: IBM 870 Transmitting Typewriter
  - IBM 536: IBM 870 Printing Card Punch
  - IBM 961: IBM 870 Tape Punch (8 channel)
  - IBM 962: IBM 870 Tape Punch (5 track)
  - IBM 972-2: IBM 870 Auxiliary Keyboard
- IBM 919: Comparing Bill Feed
- IBM 920: Bill Feed
- IBM 921: International Automatic Carriage
- IBM 933: Carbon Ribbon Feed
- IBM 939: Electrostatic Address Label Printer
- IBM 953: Multiline Posting Machine
- IBM 954: Facsimile Posting Machine (fused carbon copy fanfold printout onto an account ledger card)
- IBM 964: Auxiliary Printing Tape Punch
- IBM 966: Code Comparing Unit
- IBM 973: Keyboard
- IBM 6400: Accounting Machine system; 1962
  - IBM 6405: Account Machine
  - IBM 6410: Account Machine
  - IBM 6420: Account Machine
  - IBM 6430: Account Machine
  - IBM 6422: Auto Ledger Feed
  - IBM 6425: Magnetic Ledger Unit
  - IBM 6426: Card Punch
  - IBM 6428: Card Reader
  - IBM 6454: Paper Tape Reader
  - IBM 6455: Paper Tape Punch

=== Calculators ===
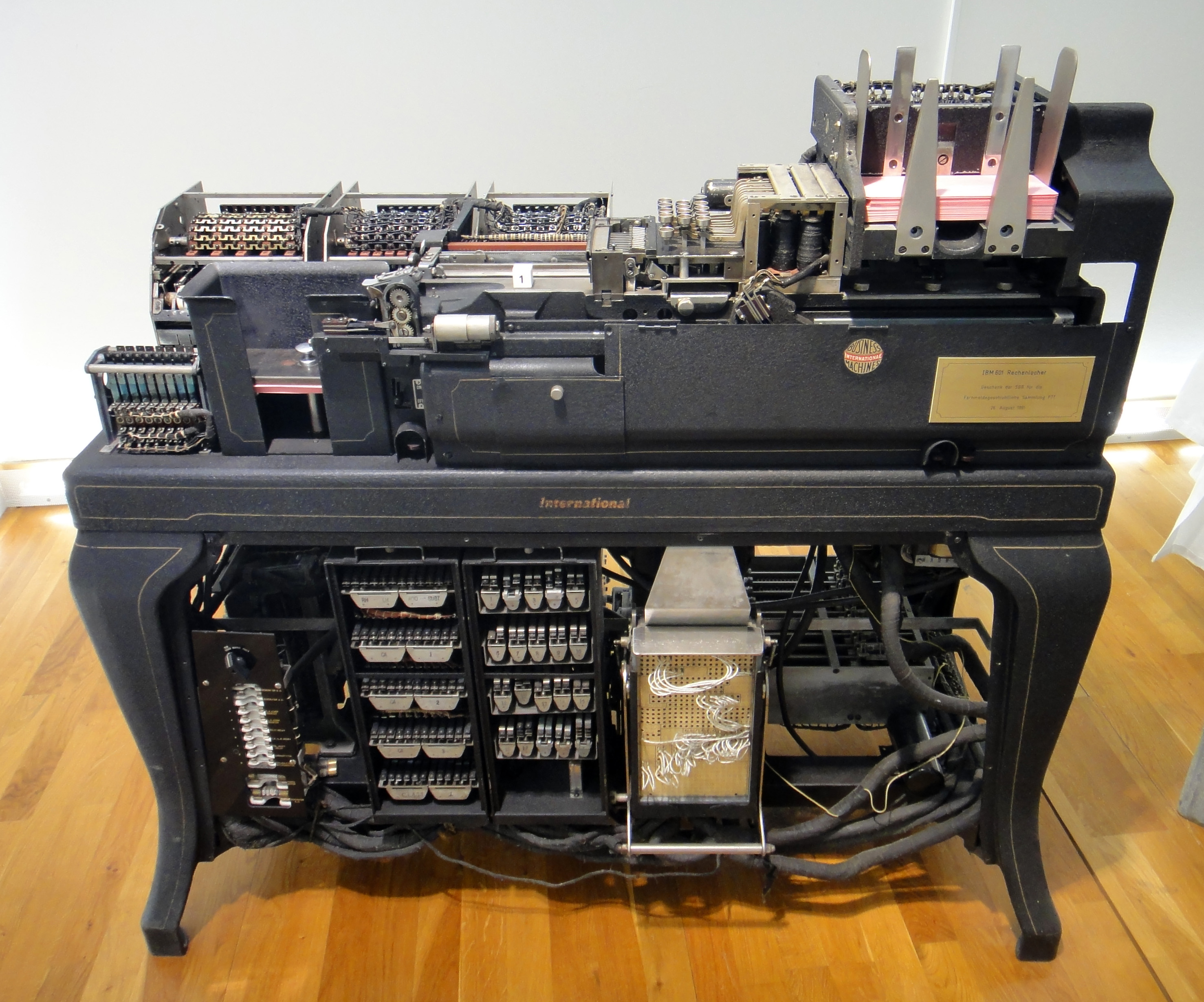
IBM 601

- IBM 20–8704-1 Machine Load Computer: Slide rule to calculate punch card processing time; 1953-1959
- IBM 600: Automatic Multiplying Punch; 1931
- IBM 601: Electric Multiplier aka Automatic Cross-Footing Multiplying Punch; 1933
- IBM Relay Calculator: aka The IBM Pluggable Sequence Relay Calculator (Aberdeen Machine)
- IBM 602: Calculating Punch; 1946
- IBM 602A: Calculating Punch; 1948
- IBM 603: Electronic Multiplier; 1946
- IBM 604: Electronic Calculating Punch; 1948
  - IBM 604: IBM 604 Calculating Unit
  - IBM 521: IBM 604 Card Read Punch
  - IBM 541: IBM 604 Card Read Punch
- IBM 605: Electronic Calculator; 1949 (version of 604)
  - IBM 527: IBM 605 High-Speed Punch
- IBM CPC: Card Programmed Electronic Calculator; 1949
  - IBM 604: IBM 604 Calculating Unit
    - IBM 521: IBM 604 Card Read Punch
  - IBM 402: Accounting Machine
  - IBM 417: Accounting Machine
  - IBM 941: IBM CPC Auxiliary Storage Unit; (16—10-digit words)
- IBM CPC-II: Card Programmed Electronic Calculator; 1949
  - IBM 605: Electronic Calculating Punch
    - IBM 527: Card Read Punch
  - IBM 412: Accounting Machine
  - IBM 418: Accounting Machine
  - IBM 941: IBM CPC Auxiliary Storage Unit; (16—10-digit words)
- IBM 607: Electronic Calculator; 1953
  - IBM 529: IBM 607 Card Read Punch
  - IBM 542: IBM 607 Card Read Punch
  - IBM 942: IBM 607 Electronic Storage Unit; 1953
- IBM 608: Transistorized Electronic Calculator; 1957
  - IBM 535: IBM 608 Card Read Punch
- IBM 609: Calculator; (transistorized) 1960
- IBM 623: Calculating Punch
- IBM 625: Calculating Punch
- IBM 626: Calculating Punch
- IBM 628: Magnetic Core Calculator
  - IBM 565: IBM 628 Punching Unit
- IBM 632, IBM 633: Electronic Typing Calculator; 1958
  - IBM 614: IBM 632/3 Typewriter output
  - IBM 630: IBM 632 Arithmetic Unit
  - IBM 631: IBM 632 Buffer memory
  - IBM 634: IBM 632 Non-printing Card Punch
  - IBM 635: IBM 632 Non-Printing Card Punch
  - IBM 636: IBM 632/3 Printing Card Punch
  - IBM 637: IBM 632 Printing Card Punch
  - IBM 638: IBM 632 Companion Keyboard
  - IBM 641: IBM 632 Card Reader
  - IBM 645: IBM 632 Card Reader
  - IBM 648: IBM 632 Tape Punch
  - IBM 649: IBM 632 Paper Tape Reader
- IBM 644: Calculating Punch

== Time equipment division ==
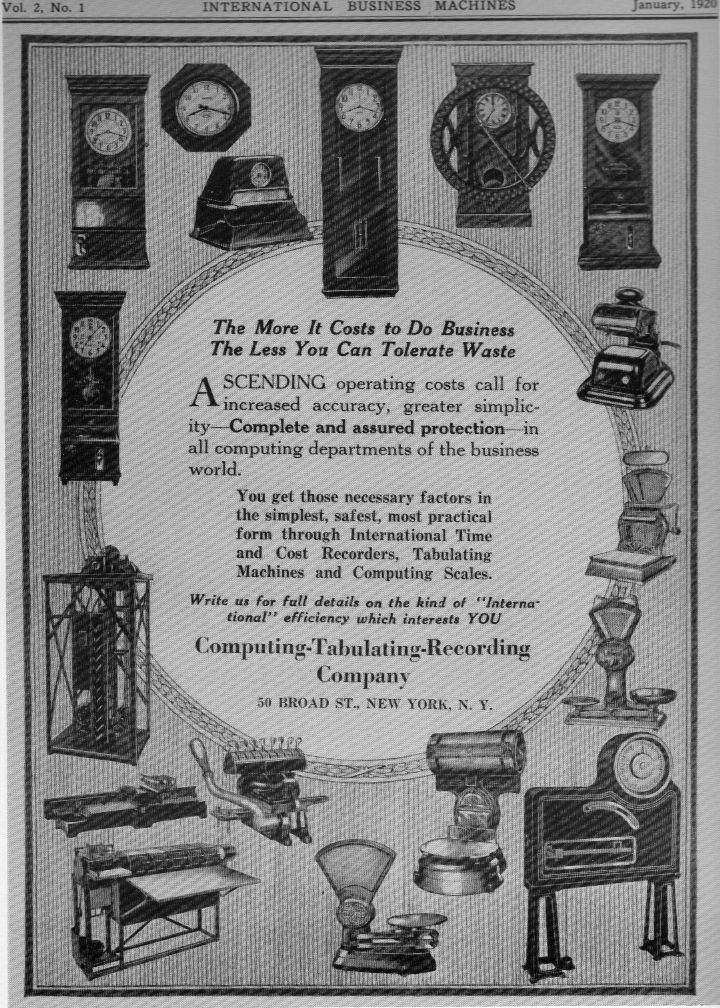
Front cover of a sales catalog from January 1920. The cover also shows scales and a portable keypunch(2nd from bottom lower left)

IBM manufactured a range of clocks and other devices until 1958 when they sold the Time Equipment Division to Simplex Time Recorder Company (SimplexGrinnell, as of 2001).

== Typewriters ==
- IBM Remote control keyboard
- IBM Electric typewriter:
  - Model 01, 1935;
  - Model 01 (Formsholder), Model 02 (Formswriter), Model 10 (Front Feed) and Model 01 (Carbon Ribbon Model), 1937;
  - Chinese Typewriter and Model 04 Arabic Electric Typewriter, 1946;
  - Model 07 Card Stencil Typewriter, 1947;
  - Models 01 and 06 with Automatic Line Selector, 1948;
- IBM Electromatic typewriter:
  - Model 03 (Hektowriter), 1938;
  - Model 06 (Toll Biller), 1940;
  - Model 08 (Auto. Formswriter) and Model 09 (Manifest), 1941;
- IBM Electric Executive Typewriter, 1944;
- IBM Electric typewriter, both Standard and Executive:
  - Model A, 1948, 1949;
  - Model B, 1954;
  - Model C, 1959;
  - Model D, 1967;
- Flexowriter: sold to Friden, Inc. in the late 1950s

=== Typeball-based ===
- IBM Selectric typewriter:
  - IBM 6121: IBM 700 Series Selectric I, 1961;
  - IBM 6126: IBM 800 Series Selectric II (1971) and Correcting Selectric II (1973);
  - IBM 6701, 6702, 6703, 6704, 6705: IBM Selectric III and Correcting Selectric III.
- Selectric-based typewriters:
  - IBM Selectric Composer, 1966;
  - IBM 6375: IBM Electronic Selectric Composer, 1975;
  - IBM 6240: Magnetic card typewriter; 1977
  - IBM Electronic Typewriter 50 and Electronic Typewriter 60, 1978;
  - IBM Personal Typewriter, 1982;

=== Daisy wheel-based ===
- IBM Wheelwriter;
  - Wheelwriter 3 and Wheelwriter 5, 1984;
  - Wheelwriter System/20 and System/40, 1985;
  - Wheelwriter 6, 1986;
  - Wheelwriter Series II and Personal Wheelwriter, 1988;
- IBM Quietwriter;

== IBM dictation machines ==
IBM dictation machines are always referenced by family and model name and never by machine type. In fact the models are sometimes mistakenly taken to be machine types. There are three brand names and several well known models:

IBM Executary dictation equipment line (1960-1972).

- IBM Executary Model 211 Dictation Machine (6165-211)
- IBM Executary Model 212 Transcribing Machine (6166-212)
- IBM Executary Model 224 Dictation Unit (6161-224)
- IBM Executary Model 271 Recorder (6171-271)

IBM input processing equipment (1972-1975)

IBM 6:5 Cartridge System (1975-1981)

- 6:5 Recorder (6164-281)
- 6:5 Transcriber (6164-282)
- 6:5 Portable (6164-284)

== Copier/Duplicators ==
IBM Copiers:

- IBM Copier (Machine type 6800-001); introduced 1970, withdrawn June 30, 1981
- IBM Copier II (Machine type 6801-001); introduced 1972
- IBM 3896 tape/document converter (a modified IBM Copier II); withdrawn 1980
- IBM Series III Copier Model 10 (Machine type 6802-001); introduced 1976
- IBM Series III Copier Model 20 (Machine type 6803-001); introduced 1976
- IBM Series III Copier Model 30 (Machine type 6805-001)
- IBM Series III Copier Model 40 (Machine type 6806-001)
- IBM Series III Copier Model 50 (Machine type 6809-001)
- IBM Series III Copier/Duplicator Model 60 (Machine type 6808-001)
- IBM Series III Copier/Duplicator Model 70 (Machine type 8880-001)
- IBM Series III Copier/Duplicator Model 85 (Machine type 8885-001)
- IBM Executive 102 Copier (Machine type 6820-001);introduced 1981, withdrawn 1982

Collators (a collator was a feature of a copier, but was sold as a separate machine type):

- IBM 6852-001 Collator
- IBM 6852-002 Collator
- IBM 6852-003 Collator
- IBM 6852-004 Collator
- IBM 8881-001 Collator
- IBM 8881-002 Collator

IBM also sold a range of copier supplies including paper rolls (marketed as IBM General Copy Bond), cut sheet paper (marketed as IBM multi-system paper) and toner.

The IBM line of Copier/Duplicators, and their associated service contracts, were sold to Eastman Kodak in 1988.

== World War II ordnance and related products ==
- M1 Carbine: Rifle
- M7 grenade launchers for M1 Garand rifles
- Browning Automatic Rifle: light machine gun
- 20-millimeter aircraft cannon
- Aircraft and naval fire-control instruments
- 90-millimeter anti-aircraft gun directors and prediction units
- Supercharger impellers
- Norden bombsight

== Other non-computer products ==
- IBM 805: IBM Test Scoring Machine, 1938
- IBM 820 Time Punch
- IBM 9902: Test Scoring Punch
- IBM Lectern: 1954
- IBM Radiotype —
- IBM Scanistor: Experimental solid-state optical scanning device
- IBM Shoebox: Voice recognition, 1962
- IBM Ticketograph: 1937
- IBM Toll Collection System —
- IBM Wireless Translation System: 1947
- IBM Hydrogen Peroxide Analyzer: 1982
- IBM PW 200 Percussive Welder: 1960s
- IBM Industrial Scale: 1930s
- IBM Style 5011: ¼ horsepower electric coffee mill; 1920s
- IBM Style 5117: ½ horsepower meat chopper; late 1920s
- IBM Electric Scoreboard: 1949
- IBM Cheese Slicer: 1901

== Computers based on vacuum tubes (1950s) ==
For these computers most components were unique to a specific computer and are shown here immediately following the computer entry.

- IBM 305: RAMAC: Random Access Method of Accounting and Control; 1956
  - IBM 305: Processing Unit
  - IBM 323: IBM 305 Card Punch
  - IBM 340: IBM 305 Power Supply
  - IBM 350: IBM 305 Disk Storage
  - IBM 370: IBM 305 Printer (not to be confused with the much later System/370 computers)
  - IBM 380: IBM 305 Console
  - IBM 381: IBM 305 Remote Printing Station
  - IBM 382: IBM 305 Paper Tape Reader
  - IBM 407: IBM 305 Accounting Machine (models R1, R2 used on-line)
- IBM 610: Automatic Decimal Point Computer; 1957
- IBM 650: Magnetic Drum Data Processing Machine; 1954
  - IBM 355: IBM 650 RAMAC (Disk drive)
  - IBM 407: IBM 650 Accounting machine on-line
  - IBM 533: IBM 650 Card Read Punch
  - IBM 537: IBM 650 Card Read Punch
  - IBM 543: IBM 650 Card Reader
  - IBM 544: IBM 650 Card Punch
  - IBM 650: IBM 650 Console Unit
  - IBM 652: IBM 650 Disk and Magnetic Tape Control Unit
  - IBM 653: IBM 650 Auxiliary Unit (60—10-digit words of auxiliary storage, index registers, and decimal floating point)
  - IBM 654: IBM 650 Auxiliary Alphabetic Unit
  - IBM 655: IBM 650 Power Unit
  - IBM 727: Magnetic Tape Reader/Recorder (7 Track—6 data bits & 1 parity bit; 200 characters/inch)
  - IBM 838: Inquiry Station
- IBM 701: Electronic Data Processing Machine; 1952. Known as the Defense Calculator while in development.
  - IBM 706: IBM 701 Electrostatic Storage Unit (2048—36-bit words)
  - IBM 711: IBM 701 Card reader (150 cards/min); 1952
  - IBM 716: IBM 701 Printer (150 lines/min); 1952
  - IBM 721: IBM 701 Punched card recorder; 1952 (100 cards/min)
  - IBM 726: IBM 701 Dual Magnetic Tape Reader/Recorder (7 Track—6 data bits & 1 parity bit; 100 characters/inch)
  - IBM 727: Magnetic Tape Reader/Recorder (7 Track—6 data bits & 1 parity bit; 200 characters/inch)
  - IBM 731: IBM 701 Magnetic Drum Reader/Recorder; 1952
  - IBM 736: IBM 701 Power Frame #1
  - IBM 737: IBM 701/IBM 704/IBM 709 Magnetic Core Storage Unit (4096—36-bit words)
  - IBM 740: IBM 701/IBM 704/IBM 709 Cathode Ray Tube Output Recorder
  - IBM 741: IBM 701 Power Frame #2
  - IBM 746: IBM 701 Power Distribution Unit
  - IBM 753: IBM 701 Magnetic Tape Control Unit
  - IBM 780: Cathode Ray Tube Display (used with IBM 740)
- IBM 702: Electronic Data Processing Machine; 1953
  - IBM 712: IBM 702 Card Reader
  - IBM 717: IBM 702 Printer
    - IBM 922: Tape-Controlled Carriage
  - IBM 722: IBM 702 Card Punch
  - IBM 727: Magnetic Tape Reader/Recorder (7 Track—6 data bits & 1 parity bit; 200 characters/inch)
  - IBM 732: IBM 702 Magnetic Drum Storage Unit
  - IBM 752: IBM 702 Tape Control Unit
  - IBM 756: IBM 702 Card Reader Control Unit
  - IBM 757: IBM 702 Printer Control Unit
  - IBM 758: IBM 702 Card Punch Control Unit
- IBM 704: Data Processing System; 1956
  - IBM 711: Card Reader
  - IBM 716: Line Printer
  - IBM 721: Card Punch
  - IBM 727: Magnetic Tape Reader/Recorder (7 Track—6 data bits & 1 parity bit; 200 characters/inch)
  - IBM 733: Magnetic Drum
  - IBM 737: IBM 701/IBM 704/IBM 709 Magnetic Core Storage Unit (4096—36-bit words, 6-bit BCD characters)
  - IBM 738: IBM 704/IBM 709 Magnetic Core Storage Unit (32768—36-bit words, 6-bit BCD characters)
  - IBM 740: IBM 701/IBM 704/IBM 709 Cathode Ray Tube Output Recorder
  - IBM 780: Cathode Ray Tube Display (used with IBM 740)
- IBM Card-to-Tape Converter (described in IBM 704 Reference manual)
  - IBM 714: Card Reader
  - IBM 727: Magnetic Tape Reader/Recorder (7 Track—6 data bits & 1 parity bit; 200 characters/inch)
  - IBM 759: Card Reader Control Unit
- IBM Tape-to-Card Converter (described in IBM 704 Reference manual)
  - IBM 722: Card Punch
  - IBM 727: Magnetic Tape Reader/Recorder (7 Track—6 data bits & 1 parity bit; 200 characters/inch)
  - IBM 758: Control Unit
- IBM Tape-controlled Printer (described in IBM 704 Reference manual)
  - IBM 717: Printer
    - IBM 922: Tape-Controlled Carriage
  - IBM 727: Magnetic Tape Reader/Recorder (7 Track—6 data bits & 1 parity bit; 200 characters/inch)
  - IBM 757: Control Unit
- IBM Tape-controlled Printer (described in IBM 704 Reference manual)
  - IBM 720: Printer
  - IBM 727: Magnetic Tape Reader/Recorder (7 Track—6 data bits & 1 parity bit; 200 characters/inch)
  - IBM 719: Printer (dot matrix, 60 print positions)
  - IBM 730: Printer (dot matrix, 120 print positions)
  - IBM 760: Printer Control Unit
- IBM 705: Data Processing System; 1954
  - IBM 714: Card Reader
  - IBM 717: Printer
    - IBM 922: Tape-Controlled Carriage
  - IBM 720: Printer
  - IBM 722: Card Punch
  - IBM 727: Magnetic Tape Reader/Recorder (7 Track—6 data bits & 1 parity bit; 200 characters/inch)
  - IBM 729: Magnetic tape drive models 1 and 3 (7 Track—6 data bits & 1 parity bit; 200/556/800 characters/inch)
  - IBM 730: Printer (dot matrix, 120 print positions)
  - IBM 734: Magnetic Drum Storage
  - IBM 754: Tape Control
  - IBM 757: Printer Control
  - IBM 758: Card Punch Control
  - IBM 759: Card Reader Control
  - IBM 760: Control and Storage; connects 2 727 tape units and a 720A or 730A printer to CPU.
  - IBM 767: Data Synchronizer
  - IBM 774: Tape Data Selector
  - IBM 777: Tape Record Coordinator
  - IBM 782: Console
- IBM 709: Data Processing System; 1958
  - IBM 711: Card Reader
  - IBM 716: Printer
  - IBM 721: Card Punch
  - IBM 729: Magnetic tape drive (7 Track—6 data bits & 1 parity bit; 200/556/800 characters/inch)
  - IBM 733: Magnetic Drum
  - IBM 737: IBM 701/IBM 704/IBM 709 Magnetic Core Storage Unit (4096—36-bit words, 6-bit BCD characters)
  - IBM 738: IBM 704/IBM 709 Magnetic Core Storage Unit (32768—36-bit words, 6-bit BCD characters)
  - IBM 740: IBM 701/IBM 704/IBM 709 Cathode Ray Tube Output Recorder
  - IBM 755: Tape Control Unit
  - IBM 766: Data Synchronizer
  - IBM 780: Cathode Ray Tube Display (used with IBM 740)
- Other (system not known)
  - IBM 735: Print Control
  - IBM 739: Additional Core Storage
  - IBM 742: Power Unit
  - IBM 743: Power Supply
  - IBM 744: Power Unit
  - IBM 745: Power Unit
  - IBM 747: Tape Data Selector PS
  - IBM 748: Data Synchronizer
  - IBM 771: Card/Tape Converter
  - IBM 775: Record Storage Unit
  - IBM 776: Sp EDPM
  - IBM 781: Console
  - IBM 786: Stretch

== Solid-state computers based on discrete transistors (1960s) ==
Further information: IBM mainframe, IBM minicomputer.

=== IBM 1400 series: 1240, 1401, 1410, 1420, 1440, 1450, 1460, 7010 ===
- IBM 1240: Banking system; 1963
  - IBM 1241: Bank Processing Unit
- IBM 1401: Small business computer; 1959
  - IBM 1402: IBM 1401 Card reader/punch
  - IBM 1403: IBM 1401 Printer, type chain; 1959
    - IBM 1416: IBM 1403 and IBM 3203 Interchangeable Train Cartridge
  - IBM 1405: IBM 1401/1410 RAMAC (Disk drive)
  - IBM 1406: IBM 1401 Memory Expansion Unit (4000/8000/12000—6-bit characters, check bit, and wordmark)
  - IBM 1407: IBM 1401 Console Inquiry Station
  - IBM 1409: IBM 1401 Console Auxiliary
  - IBM 7641: IBM 1401/1410/1460 Hypertape Control
- IBM 1410: Midrange business computer; 1960
  - IBM 1411: IBM 1410 processing unit
  - IBM 1414: IBM 1410/7010: I/O Synchronizer
    - IBM 1014: IBM 1414 Remote Inquiry Unit
  - IBM 1415: IBM 1410/7010—Console
  - IBM 7631: IBM 1410/7010, IBM 7070/7074, 7080—File Control
- IBM 1420: High-speed bank transit system; 1962
- IBM 1440: Low-cost business computer; 1962
  - IBM 1441: IBM 1440 Processing unit; 1962
  - IBM 1442: IBM 1440, IBM 1130, and IBM System/360 Card reader/punch
  - IBM 1443: IBM 1440/IBM 1620 II Printer, flying type bar
  - IBM 1447: IBM 1240/1401/1440/1450/1460 Operator's Console
  - IBM 1448: IBM 1240/1440/1460 Transmission Control Unit(between system and 1030/1050/1060/AT&T...)
- IBM 1450: Data Processing System for small banks; 1968
- IBM 1460: Almost twice as fast as the 1401; 1963
  - IBM 1447: IBM 1460 System Console
  - IBM 1461: IBM 1460—Input/Output Control
  - IBM 1462: IBM 1460—Printer Control
- IBM 7010: High-capacity version of 1410; 1962

=== IBM 1620 ===
- IBM 1620: Data Processing System; 1959
  - IBM 1443: IBM 1440/IBM 1620 II Printer, flying type bar
  - IBM 1621: IBM 1620 Paper tape reader
  - IBM 1622: IBM 1620 Punched card reader/punch
  - IBM 1623: IBM 1620 I Memory Expansion Unit (20000/40000—4-bit digits, flag and check bits; CF8421)
  - IBM 1624: IBM 1620 Paper tape punch
  - IBM 1625: IBM 1620 II Memory Unit (20000/40000/60000—4-bit digits, flag and check bits; CF8421)
  - IBM 1626: IBM 1620 Plotter control
  - IBM 1627: IBM 1620 Plotter. Also used by IBM 1130.

=== IBM 7030 (Stretch) ===
- IBM 7030: Supercomputer; 1960 (Stretch)
  - IBM 353: IBM 7030 Disk drive
  - IBM 354: IBM 7030 Disk drive controller
  - IBM 7152: IBM 7030 Operator's Console
  - IBM 7302: IBM 7030 Core Storage (16384 72-bit words: 64 data bits & 8 ECC bits)
  - IBM 7303: IBM 7030 Disk Storage
  - IBM 7503: IBM 7030 Punched card reader
  - IBM 7612: IBM 7030 Disk Synchronizer
  - IBM 7619: IBM 7030 I/O exchange (8, 16, 24, or 32 I/O channels)

=== IBM 7070 series: 7070, 7072, 7074 ===
- IBM 7070: Intermediate data processing system; 1960
- IBM 7072: Intermediate data processing system; 1962
- IBM 7074: Intermediate data processing system; 1961
  - IBM 729: IBM 7070/IBM 7074 Magnetic tape Unit
  - IBM 1301: IBM 7070/IBM 7074 Disk Storage
  - IBM 1302: IBM 7070/IBM 7074 Disk Storage
  - IBM 7104: IBM 7074 High-Speed Processor
  - IBM 7150: IBM 7070/IBM 7074 Console Control Unit
  - IBM 7300: IBM 7070/IBM 7074 Disk Storage
  - IBM 7301: IBM 7070/IBM 7074 Core Storage (5000/9990—10-digit words)
  - IBM 7340: IBM 7070/IBM 7074 hypertape (7074 only)
  - IBM 7400: IBM 7070/IBM 7074 Printer
  - IBM 7500: IBM 7070/IBM 7074 Card Reader
  - IBM 7501: IBM 7070/IBM 7074 Console Card Reader
  - IBM 7550: IBM 7070/IBM 7074 Card Punch
  - IBM 7600: IBM 7070/IBM 7074 Input-Output Control
  - IBM 7601: IBM 7070 Arithmetic and Program Control
  - IBM 7602: IBM 7070/IBM 7074 Core Storage Controller for IBM 7301
  - IBM 7603: IBM 7070/IBM 7074 Input-Output Synchronizer
  - IBM 7604: IBM 7070/IBM 7074 Tape Control
  - IBM 7605: IBM 7070/IBM 7074 Disk Control
  - IBM 7631: IBM 1410/IBM 7010, IBM 7070/IBM 7074, IBM 7080 File Control
  - IBM 7640: IBM 7074/IBM 7080 Hypertape Control
  - IBM 7802: IBM 7070/IBM 7074 Power Converter
  - IBM 7907: IBM 7070/IBM 7074 Data Channel (8 bit)
- IBM 7710: Data Communication Unit
- IBM 7711: Data Communication Unit

=== IBM 7080 ===
- IBM 7080: High-capacity business computer; 1961
  - IBM 717: IBM 7080 150 LPM printer
  - IBM 720: IBM 7080 500 LPM printer
  - IBM 729: IBM 7080 Magnetic tape Unit
  - IBM 730: IBM 7080 1000 LPM printer
  - IBM 735: IBM 7080 Printer Control for IBM 730
  - IBM 757: IBM 7080 printer control for 717
  - IBM 760: IBM 7080 Control and Storage
    - Model 1 for IBM 720 Printer
    - Model 2 for IBM 730 Printer
  - IBM 1301: IBM 7080 Disk Storage
  - IBM 1302: IBM 7080 Disk Storage
  - IBM 7153: IBM 7080 Console Control Unit
  - IBM 7302: IBM 7080 Core Storage (80000/160000—6-bit characters, check bit; CBA8421)
  - IBM 7305: IBM 7080 Core Storage Controller and I/O Controller for IBM 7302
  - IBM 7502: IBM 7080 Console Card Reader
  - IBM 7621: IBM 7080 Tape Control (729)
  - IBM 7622: IBM 7080 Signal Control (vacuum tube peripherals)
  - IBM 7631: IBM 7080 File Control
  - IBM 7640: IBM 7080 Hypertape Control
  - IBM 7800: IBM 7080 Power Converter
  - IBM 7801: IBM 7080 Power Control
  - IBM 7908: IBM 7080 Data Channel (8 bit)

=== IBM 7090 series: 7040, 7044, 7090, 7094, 7094 II ===
- IBM 7040: Low-cost version of 7094; 1963 Included an extension to the 7090/7094 instruction set to handle character string(s) thus improving the speed of commercial applications (COBOL).
  - IBM 7106: Processing Unit
  - IBM 1414: IBM 7040 I/O Synchronizer
    - IBM 1014: IBM 1414 Remote Inquiry Unit
  - IBM 1401: IBM 7040 card, printer, magnetic tape, tele-processing input/output
- IBM 7044: Low-cost version of 7094; 1963 This was a high performance version of the 7040 with the same extensions to the 7090/7094 instruction set; it also attached 7094 I/O devices.
  - IBM 7107: Processing Unit
  - IBM 1414: IBM 7040 I/O Synchronizer
  - IBM 1401: IBM 7040 card, printer, magnetic tape, tele-processing input/output
- IBM 7090: High-capacity scientific computer; 1959
- IBM 7094: Improved version of 7090; 1962
- IBM 7094 II: Improved version of 7094; 1964
  - IBM 711: IBM 7090/IBM 7094 Card Reader
  - IBM 716: IBM 7090/IBM 7094 Printer
  - IBM 721: IBM 7090/IBM 7094 Card Punch
  - IBM 729: IBM 7090/IBM 7094 Magnetic tape Unit
  - IBM 1301: IBM 7090/IBM 7094 Disk Storage
  - IBM 1302: IBM 7090/IBM 7094 Disk Storage
  - IBM 7151: IBM 7090 Console Control Unit
  - IBM 7151-2: IBM 7094 Console Control Unit
  - IBM 7302: IBM 7090/IBM 7094/IBM 7094 II Core Storage (32768—36-bit words, 6-bit BCD characters)
  - IBM 7320: IBM 7090/IBM 7094 Drum Storage
  - IBM 7340: IBM 7090/IBM 7094 Hypertape
  - IBM 7606: IBM 7090/IBM 7094/IBM 7094 II Multiplexer and Core Storage Controller for IBM 7302
  - IBM 7607: IBM 7090/IBM 7094 Data Channel (6 bit)
  - IBM 7608: IBM 7090 Power Converter
  - IBM 7617: IBM 7090/IBM 7094 Data Channel Console
  - IBM 7618: IBM 7090 Power Control
  - IBM 7631: IBM 7090/IBM 7094 File Control
  - IBM 7640: IBM 7090/IBM 7094 Hypertape Control
  - IBM 7909: IBM 7090/IBM 7094 Data Channel (8 bit)
  - IBM 2361: NASA's Manned Spacecraft Center IBM 7094 II Core Storage Unit (524288—36-bit words); 1964

== Later solid-state computers & systems ==
=== Computers based on SLT or discrete IC CPUs (1964–1989) ===
- IBM 1130: entry-level scientific computer; 1965
  - IBM 1131: IBM 1130 Processor
  - IBM 1132: IBM 1130 Printer, based on IBM 407 type-wheel mechanism
  - IBM 1133: IBM 1130 Multiplexer and cycle stealer, to connect an IBM 1403 fast printer
- IBM 2020: System/360 Model 20 Central Processing Unit; almost a 360: 1966
- IBM 2022: System/360 Model 22 Central Processing Unit; small range 360
- IBM 2025: System/360 Model 25 Central Processing Unit; small range 360
- IBM 2030: System/360 Model 30 Central Processing Unit; small range 360
- IBM 2040: System/360 Model 40 Central Processing Unit; small range 360
- IBM 2044: System/360 Model 44 Central Processing Unit; scientific 360; business with special feature
- IBM 2050: System/360 Model 50 Central Processing Unit; mid range 360
- IBM 2060: System/360 Models 60 and 62 Central Processing Unit; mid-range 360; announced but never released
- IBM 2064: System/360 Models 64 and 66 Central Processing Unit; mid range 360; multi-processor with virtual memory (DAT); announced but never released
- IBM 2065: System/360 Model 65 Central Processing Unit; mid range 360: used by NASA in Apollo project
- IBM 2067: System/360 Model 67 Central Processing Unit; mid range 360; multi-processor with virtual memory (DAT)
- IBM 2070: System/360 Model 70 Central Processing Unit; high range 360; announced but never released
- IBM 2075: System/360 Model 75 Central Processing Unit; high range 360
- IBM 2085: System/360 Model 85 Central Processing Unit; high range 360
  - IBM 5450: Display console used with Model 85 (80 characters x 35 lines)
- IBM 2091: System/360 Model 91 Central Processing Unit; high range 360
- IBM 2095: System/360 Model 95 Central Processing Unit; high range 360
- IBM 2195: System/360 Model 195 Central Processing Unit; high range 360
- IBM 3031: System/370-compatible mainframe; high range (first series to incorporate integral, i.e., internal, stand-alone channels, these being stripped-down 3158-type CPUs, but operating in "channel mode", only)
  - IBM 3017: Power Distribution Unit/Motor Generator (3031 processor complex)
- IBM 3032: System/370-compatible mainframe; high range (first series to incorporate integral, i.e., internal, stand-alone channels, these being stripped-down 3158-type CPUs, but operating in "channel mode", only)
  - IBM 3027: Power and Coolant Distribution Unit (3032 processor complex)
- IBM 3033: System/370-compatible multiprocessor complex; high range; 1977 (first series to incorporate integral, i.e., internal, stand-alone channels, these being stripped-down 3158-type CPUs, but operating in "channel mode", only)
  - IBM 3037: Power and Coolant Distribution Unit (3033 processor complex)
- IBM 3036: Dual-display (operator's) console, shipped with 303X
- IBM 3038: Multiprocessor Communication Unit for 3033 MP
- IBM 3042: Attached processor for 3033 Model A
- IBM 3081: System/370-compatible dual-processor mainframe; high range; models: D, G, G2, GX, K (1981), K2, KX (2 = enhanced version); 1980
  - IBM 3082: Processor Controller
  - IBM 3087: Coolant Distribution Unit
  - IBM 3089: Power Unit
- IBM 3083: System/370-compatible mainframe, single processor 3081; high range; models: B (1982), B2, BX, CX, E (1982), E2, EX, J (1982), J2, JX
- IBM 3084: System/370-compatible Quad-processor mainframe; high range; 3081 + 3081 with same serial number, but two on/off switches; models: Q 2-way, Q 2-way2, QX 2-way, Q 4-way, Q 4-way2, QX 4-way; 1982
- IBM 3090: System/370 mainframe; high range; J series supersedes S series. Models: 150, 150E, 180, 200 (1985), 400 2-way (1985), 400 4-way (1985), 600E (1987), 600S (1988). A 400 actually consists of two 200s mounted together in a single frame. Although it provides an enormous computing power, some limits, like CSA size, are still fixed by the 16MB line in MVS.
  - IBM 3097: Power and Coolant Distribution Unit
- IBM 3115: System/370 Model 115 Central Processing Unit; small range
- IBM 3125: System/370 Model 125 Central Processing Unit; small range
- IBM 3135: System/370 Model 135 Central Processing Unit; small range
- IBM 3145: System/370 Model 145 Central Processing Unit; small range
- IBM 3155: System/370 Model 155 Central Processing Unit; mid range; without virtual memory [DAT] unless upgraded to 155-II
- IBM 3165: System/370 Model 165 Central Processing Unit; mid range; without virtual memory [DAT] unless upgraded to 165-II
  - IBM 3066: Display console used with Models 165 and 166 (80 characters x 35 lines)
- IBM 3138: System/370 Model 138 Central Processing Unit; small range;
- IBM 3148: System/370 Model 148 Central Processing Unit; small range;
- IBM 3158: System/370 Model 158 Central Processing Unit; mid range;
- IBM 3168: System/370 Model 168 Central Processing Unit; high range;
  - IBM 3066: Display console used with Models 165 and 166 (80 characters x 35 lines)
- IBM 3195: System/370 Model 195 Central Processing Unit; high range; without virtual memory [DAT]
- IBM 3741: data station; 1973
- IBM 3790: distributed computer; announced 1975 (followed by the IBM 8100)
  - IBM 3791: Controller, model 1 or 2.
  - IBM 3792: Auxiliary control unit.
  - IBM 3793: Keyboard-Printer.
- IBM 4300: series of System/370-compatible mainframe models; 1979
  - IBM 4321: System/370-compatible mainframe; low range; successor of 4331
  - IBM 4321: System/370-compatible mainframe; low range; 1979
  - IBM 4331: System/370-compatible mainframe; low range; 1979
  - IBM 4341: System/370-compatible mainframe; mid range; 1979
  - IBM 4361: System/370-compatible mainframe; low range; 1983
  - IBM 4381: System/370-compatible mainframe; mid range; 1983
- IBM 5100: portable computer; evolution of the 1973 SCAMP (Special Computer APL Machine Portable) prototype; 1975
  - IBM 5103: Dot matrix printer
- IBM 5110: portable computer; models 1, 2 & 3 featured a QIC tape drive, and then floppy disk drives; 1978
- IBM 5120: portable computer; featured two built-in 8-inch 1.2 MB floppy disk drives; 1980
- IBM 5280: Distributed Data System; 1980
  - IBM 5281: Data Station for 5280
  - IBM 5282: Dual Data Station for 5280
  - IBM 5285: Programmable Data Station
  - IBM 5286: Dual Programmable Data Station
  - IBM 5288: Programmable Control Unit
  - IBM 5225: Printer for 5280 (floor-standing; Models 1, 2, 3, 4)
  - IBM 5256: Printer for 5280 (table-top, dot-matrix; Models 1, 2, 3)
- IBM 5320: System/32, low-end business computer; 1975
- IBM 5340: System/34, System unit, successor of System/32, but had also a second System/3 processor; 1977
- IBM 5360: System/36 System Unit
- IBM 5362: System/36 System Unit
- IBM 5363: System/36 System Unit
- IBM 5364; System/36 System Unit
- IBM 5381: System/38 System Unit; 1978
- IBM 5382: System/38 System Unit
- IBM 5410: System/3 model 10 processor; for small businesses; 1969
- IBM 5415: System/3 model 15 processor; 1973
- IBM 5520: Administrative System; 1979
- IBM 8100: distributed computer; announced 1978
- IBM 8150: processor
- IBM 9370: series of System/370 mainframe models; partly replaced IBM 8100; low range; 1986
  - IBM 9371: "Micro Channel 370" ESA models 010, 012, 014 (later 110, 112, 114); 1990
  - IBM 9373: models 20, 30
  - IBM 9375: models 40, 50, 60
  - IBM 9377: models 80 and 90
- IBM Series/1: brand name for process control computers; 1976
- IBM System/3: brand name for small business computers; 1969
- IBM System/36: brand name for minicomputers; successor of System/34; 1983
- IBM System/38: brand name for minicomputers; indirect successor of IBM Future Systems project; 1979
- IBM System/360: brand name for mainframes; 1964
- IBM System/370: brand name for mainframes, successor of System/360; 1970
- Application System/400: brand name for computers, successor of System/38; 1988

=== Computers based on discrete IC CPUs (1990–present) ===
- IBM ES/9000 family of System/390 mainframes; 1990
  - IBM ES/9021: water-cooled ES/9000 type
  - IBM ES/9121: air-cooled standalone ES/9000 type
  - IBM ES/9221: air-cooled rack mounted ES/9000 type
- IBM 9406: AS/400 minicomputer
- IBM AS/400: midrange computer system, successor to System/38; 1988
- System/390: brand name for mainframes with ESA/390 architecture; successor of System/370; 1990

=== Computers based on microprocessor CPUs (1981–present) ===
==== Computers ====
- IBM System/23: Datamaster, based on the Intel 8085
  - 5322 Desktop all-in-one model
  - 5324 Floor tower model
- IBM 2003: a very small mainframe with System/390 architecture; 1990s, also known as Multiprise 2000
- IBM 2064: zSeries z900; note number collision with earlier System/360-64; 2000
- IBM 2066: zSeries z800; less powerful variant of the z900
- IBM 2084: zSeries z990; successor of larger z900 models
- IBM 2086: zSeries z890; successor of the z800 and smaller z900 models; 2004
- IBM 2094: System z9 Enterprise Class (z9 EC); initially known as z9-109; 2005
- IBM 2096: System z9 Business Class (z9 BC); successor to z890; 2006
- IBM 2097: System z10 Enterprise Class (z10 EC); successor to z9 EC; 2008
- IBM 2098: System z10 Business Class (z10 BC); successor to z9 BC; 2008
- IBM 2817: zEnterprise 196 (z196); successor to z10 EC; 2010
- IBM 2818: zEnterprise 114 (z114); successor to z10 BC; 2011
- IBM 2827: zEnterprise EC12 (zEC12); successor to z196; 2012
- IBM 2828: zEnterprise BC12 (zBC12); successor to z114; 2013
- IBM 2964: IBM z Systems z13 (z13); successor to zEC12; 2015
- IBM Personal Computer: Superseded the IBM Portable Computer.
  - IBM 5150: the classic IBM PC—1981
  - IBM 5160: IBM Personal Computer XT—1983
  - IBM 5162: IBM Personal Computer XT/286
  - IBM 5271: IBM 3270 PC—1983
  - IBM 5160 Model 588: PC XT/370, a PC XT with a special add-in card containing an Intel 8087 math coprocessor and two modified Motorola 68000 chips to execute/emulate the System/370 instructions—1983.
  - IBM 5155: IBM Portable—1984
  - IBM 4860: IBM PCjr—1984
  - IBM 5170: IBM Personal Computer/AT—1984
  - IBM 5140: IBM Convertible—1986
  - IBM 5281: IBM 3270 PC but based on an IBM AT.
- IBM 5550: Personal Computer Series for Japan, South Korea, Taiwan and China
  - IBM 5510: IBM JX (for Japan, Australia and New Zealand)
  - IBM 5511: IBM JX (for Japan, Australia and New Zealand)
  - IBM 5530: Smaller desktop, without communications adapter
  - IBM 5535: Portable
  - IBM 5541: Desktop
  - IBM 5551: Floor standing
  - IBM 5561: Larger floor standing
- IBM PS/2: range
- IBM PS/1: range, later succeeded by IBM Aptiva
- IBM Aptiva: Personal Computer
- IBM PS/ValuePoint: range
- IBM RT PC: series; ROMP-based; 1986
- IBM 4575: System/88 processor; 1986
- IBM 4576: System/88 processor
- IBM 7060, also known as Multiprise 3000: a very small mainframe with System/390 architecture; models H30, H50, H70; 1999
- IBM System 9000: lab data controller, based on Motorola 68000
- IBM 9075: PCradio, a battery-powered personal computer; 1991
- IBM 9672: largest mainframes from System/390 line; 1994
  - G1: 9672-Rn1, 9672-Enn, 9672-Pnn
  - G2: 9672-Rn2, 9672-Rn3
  - G3: 9672-Rn4
  - G4: 9672-Rn5
  - G5: 9672-nn6
  - G6: 9672-nn7
- IBM 9674: coupling facility for interconnecting IBM 9672 computers
- IBM PC Series: PC300 and 700 range including 300GL and 300PL
- IBM NetVista: Corporate PCs
- IBM ThinkCentre: PC range now made under license by Lenovo Group
- IBM ThinkPad: Notebooks now made under license by Lenovo Group
- IBM IntelliStation Workstations: Pro based on Intel PC processors, and POWER based on PowerPC processors
- System/390: brand name for mainframes with ESA/390 architecture; successor of System/370; 1990
- IBM AS/400: Later iSeries and System i, merged into IBM Power Systems in 2008; 1988
- IBM System p: First RS/6000, then pSeries, then p5 and now System p5, merged into IBM Power Systems in 2008; 1990
- IBM System x: Originally PC Server, then Netfinity, then xSeries and now System x
- System z: brand name for mainframes with z/Architecture; rename of zSeries; 2006
- zSeries: brand name for mainframes with z/Architecture; successor of System/390; 2000
- IBM PureSystems: Converged system
- IBM System Cluster 1350
- IBM BladeCenter: IBM's Blade server architecture
- IBM eServer 32x: AMD processor-based server products
- IBM OpenPower: POWER5 based hardware for running Linux.

==== Supercomputers ====
- IBM Blue Gene: 2000
- IBM Kittyhawk: 2008 White paper issued.

==== Microprocessors ====
- IBM 801: Pioneering prototype RISC processor; 1980
- IBM ROMP: RISC processor, also known as 032 processor
- IBM APC: RISC Processor, successor to the 032
- IBM CnC/M68000: Processor for XT/370 and AT/370
- IBM P/370: Processor for Personal System 370
- IBM P/390 microprocessor: processor for P/390 and R/390
- IBM Power: Processors for some RS/6000 and successors, later IBM AS/400, and IBM Power Systems
  - POWER1
  - POWER2
  - POWER3
  - POWER4
  - POWER5
  - POWER6
  - POWER7
  - POWER8
  - POWER9
  - Power10
- PowerPC: Processors for some RS/6000 and successors and earlier IBM AS/400, some also used in non-IBM systems
  - PowerPC 601
  - PowerPC 603
  - PowerPC 604
  - PowerPC 620
  - PowerPC 7xx
  - PowerPC 4xx embedded CPUs
  - IBM RS64
  - PowerPC 970
  - Cell microprocessor
  - Gekko, Broadway and Xenon CPUs for game consoles.
- IBM z/Architecture processors: for z/Architecture mainframes
  - IBM z10
  - IBM z196
  - IBM zEC12
  - IBM z13
  - IBM z14
  - IBM z15
  - IBM Telum

== Solid-state computer peripherals ==
=== Punched card and paper tape equipment ===
- IBM 1011: IBM 1401/1440/1460/1414 I/O Sync—Paper Tape Reader
- IBM 1012: IBM 1401/1440/1460—Tape Punch
- IBM 1017: IBM S/360—Paper Tape Reader
- IBM 1018: IBM S/360—Paper Tape Punch
- IBM 1134: paper tape reader
- IBM 1402: IBM 1401 and several other systems card reader/punch
- IBM 1412: Punched card reader/punch
- IBM 1442: IBM 1440 and IBM System/360 Card reader/punch
- IBM 1444: IBM 1240/1440 Punched card reader/punch
- IBM 1622: IBM 1620 Card reader/punch
- IBM 1902: Paper Tape Punch
- IBM 1903: Paper Tape Reader
- IBM 2501: IBM System/360 Card reader (up to 1,200 cpm)
- IBM 2502: Card Reader
- IBM 2520 Card Read Punch (Model A1), Card Punch (Models A2, A3)
- IBM 2540: IBM System/360 Card reader/punch
- IBM 2560: IBM System/360 Model 20 Multifunction card machine (reader/punch/interpreter/multi-hopper)
- IBM 2671: Paper Tape Reader
- IBM 2826: Control unit for 1017 and 1018
- IBM 3504: Card reader
- IBM 3505: Card reader
- IBM 3525: Multi-function card unit
- IBM 5424: IBM System/3 MFCU Multi Function Card Unit (reader/punch/printer/multi-hopper)- 96 column cards
- IBM 5425: IBM System/370 MFCU Multi Function Card Unit (reader/punch/printer/multi-hopper), for handling 96-column cards

=== Microfilm products ===
IBM announced a range of Microfilm products in 1963 and 1964 and withdrew them in 1969.

- IBM 9921: Document Viewer Model I
- IBM 9922: Document Viewer Model II
- IBM 9948: Thermal Copier
- IBM 9949: Micro Viewer
- IBM 9950: Diazo Copier
- IBM 9951: Camera
- IBM 9952: Standard Micro-Viewer-Printer
- IBM 9953: Viewer-Printer Stacker Module
- IBM 9954: Diazo Copier
- IBM 9955: Microfiche Processor
- IBM 9956: Camera
- IBM 9965: Diazo Copier

=== Printer/plotter equipment ===
- IBM 1094: Line-Entry Keyboard
- IBM 1403: High-Speed Impact Printer
- IBM 1404: IBM 1401/Sys360—Printer
- IBM 1416: Impact Printer print character chain
- IBM 1445: IBM 1240/1401/1440/Sys360—Printer
- IBM 1446: IBM 1440—Printer Control unit for 1403
- IBM 2203: Printer
- IBM 2213: Printer
- IBM 2245: Line printer for Chinese, Japanese and Korean text
- IBM 2280: Film Recorder
- IBM 2282: Film Recorder/Scanner
- IBM 2285: Display Copier
- IBM 2680: High-speed photo typesetter; 1967
- IBM 3130: Advanced Function Printer
- IBM 3160: Advanced Function Printer
- IBM 3170: Full Color Digital Printer
- IBM 3203: Printer
- IBM 3211: High-Speed Impact Printer for Sys/370
- IBM 3216: 3211 Impact Printer's character print train
- IBM 3262: Line printer
- IBM 3268: Dot matrix printer
- IBM 3284: Printer
- IBM 3287: Color printer; 1979
- IBM 3288: Line printer
- IBM 3800: First laser printer introduced by IBM; 1976–1990. incl. photo
  - IBM 3800-1: Early laser printer, 1975
  - IBM 3800-2: Part of IBM Kanji System for Japanese language processing, 1979
  - IBM 3800-3: Continuous form printer; 1982
- IBM 3811: Control Unit for 3211
- IBM 3812: Table top page printer; 12 ppm, 1986
- IBM 3816: Table top page printer; 24 ppm, 1989
- IBM 3820: Laser page printer; 20 ppm, 1985
- IBM 3825: Laser page printer; 58 ppm, 1989
- IBM 3827: Laser page printer; 92 ppm, 1988
- IBM 3828: MICR Laser page printer; 92 ppm, 1990
- IBM 3829: Laser page printer; 92 ppm, 1993
- IBM 3835: Continuous forms laser printer; 88ppm, 1988
- IBM 3852-2: Inkjet printer for IBM 3192 terminal
- IBM 3900: Various models 001; OW1 DR1/2 etc., succeeded by infoprint 4000
- IBM 3935: Laser page printer; 35 ppm, 1993
- IBM 4000: Various models succeeded by infoprint 4100
- IBM 4019: Laser printer for PC. 10 text pages per minute.
- IBM 4039-16L: Lexmark laser printer
- IBM 4055: InfoWindow touch screen display
- IBM 4079: Color inkjet printer
- IBM 4201: ProPrinterII Model 002
- IBM 4202: ProPrinter XL
- IBM 4207: ProPrinter X24
- IBM 4208: ProPrinter XL24
- IBM 4210: APA matrix table top WS printer for the S/38-36
- IBM 4214: Table top printer
- IBM 4216: Personal pageprinter model 020
- IBM 4224: Table top serial printer; 1986
- IBM 4230: Tabletop matrix printer, 600cps. Also 4232
- IBM 4234: Floor standing dot band printer; 1986
- IBM 4245: Line printer
- IBM 4247: Tabletop matrix printer, 1100cps
- IBM 4248: Impact printer; 1984
- IBM 4250/II: ElectroCompositor model 002
- IBM 4279: Terminal Control Unit (for 4506 Digital TV Displays)
- IBM 4506: Digital TV display unit
- IBM 4975: Printer
- IBM 5083: Tablet
- IBM 5087: Screen printer
- IBM 5201: Printer
- IBM 5202: Printer (Quietwriter III)
- IBM 5203: Line printer for System/3. Ran at 100 or 200 lines per minute.
- IBM 5210: Printer
- IBM 5211: Printer 160 or 300 lpm, sold with System/34
- IBM 5215: Selectric-element printer for Displaywriter
- IBM 5218: Daisywheel printer for Displaywriter
- IBM 5219: Letter quality printer
- IBM 5223: Wheelprinter E
- IBM 5224: Table top printer
- IBM 5225: Floor standing printer
- IBM 5253: CRT display station for 5520; 1979
- IBM 5254: CRT display station for 5520; 1979
- IBM 5256: Table top printer; 1977
- IBM 5257: Daisy wheel printer for 5520; 1979
- IBM 5258: Ink jet printer for 5520; 1979
- IBM 5262: Floor standing line printer
- IBM 5294: Twinax remote control unit
- IBM 5394: Twinax remote controller (also 5494)
- IBM 6180: Color plotter
- IBM 6186: Color plotter
- IBM 6262: Line Printer
- IBM 6400: Line matrix printer
- IBM 6500: IPDS printer, coax or twinax attached
- IBM 6670: Information Distributor; combination laser printer and photocopier; part of Office System/6; 1979
- IBM 7701: Magnetic Tape Transmission Terminal; 1960
- IBM 7372: Color plotter, 6 pen, desktop
- IBM 7374: Color plotter
- IBM 7375: Color plotter
- IBM 7350: Image processor, a specialized terminal for scientific and research applications; 1983
- IBM 7400: IBM 7070/IBM 7074 Printer
- IBM 7404: Graphic Output
- IBM 7456: Plant floor terminal
- IBM 7900: IBM 7070/IBM 7074 Inquiry Station
- IBM 8775: Terminal
- IBM LPFK: Lighted Program Function Keyboard
- IBM XY749: Plotter
- IBM XY750: Plotter

=== Graphics displays ===
- IBM 2350: Graphics display system; 1977
- IBM 5081: Color and monochrome display; separate RGB connections, capable of 1280×1024 resolution, up to 21-inch (530 mm) diagonal.
- IBM 5080: Graphics System; for System/370
- IBM 5085: Graphics Processor. Part of IBM 5080 Graphics System for System/370.
- IBM 5088: Graphics Channel Controller. Part of IBM 5080 Graphics System for System/370.
- IBM 6090: High-end graphics system for the System/370
- IBM 6153: Advanced monochrome graphics display
- IBM 6154: Advanced color graphics display
- IBM 6155: Extended monochrome graphics display

=== Data storage units ===
==== Core storage ====
- IBM 2360: Processor Storage for the (never shipped) IBM System/360 models 60 and 64
- IBM 2361: Large Capacity Storage for the IBM System/360 models 50, 60, 62, 65, 70, and 75
- IBM 2362: Processor Storage for the (never shipped) IBM System/360 models 62, 66, 68 and 70
- IBM 2365: Processor Storage for the IBM System/360 models 65, 67, 75 and 85
- IBM 2385: Processor Storage for the IBM System/360 model 85
- IBM 2395: Processor Storage for the IBM System/360 models 91 and 95

==== Direct-access storage devices ====
In IBM's terminology beginning with the System/360 disk and such devices featuring short access times were collectively called DASD. The IBM 2321 Data Cell is a DASD that used tape as its storage medium. See also history of IBM magnetic disk drives.

- IBM 353: Disk drive for IBM 7030 Stretch
- IBM 1301: IBM 1240/1410/1440/1460/70XX—Disk drive; 1961
- IBM 1302: Disk drive
- IBM 1311: IBM 1240/1401/1410/1440/1450/1460/1620/7010/1710/7740 Disk drive using IBM 1316 disk pack
  - IBM 1316: 2,000,000-character removable disk pack for 1311, 2311; 1962
- IBM 1405: Disk drive
- IBM 1742: IBM System Storage DS4500
- IBM 1814: IBM System Storage DS4700
- IBM 1750: IBM System Storage DS6000 Series
- IBM 1815: IBM System Storage DS4800
- IBM 2072: IBM Storwize V3700 (IBM FlashSystem 5000)
- IBM 2073: IBM Storwize V7000 Unified
- IBM 2076: IBM Storwize V7000 (IBM FlashSystem 7200)
- IBM 2078: IBM Storwize V5000
- IBM 2105: Enterprise Storage Server, or ESS, or Shark (utilized 7133)
- IBM 2106: Extender for IBM 2105 Shark
- IBM 2107: IBM System Storage DS8000 Series
- IBM 2301: Drum Storage Unit
- IBM 2302: Disk drive
- IBM 2303: Drum Storage Unit
- IBM 2305-1: Fixed head disk 3.0 MB/s Transfer rate, 5 MB capacity
- IBM 2305-2: Fixed head disk 1.5 MB/s Transfer rate, 10 MB capacity
- IBM 2310: Cartridge disk drive, used 2315 cartridge.
  - IBM 2315: 1 MB cartridge used on 2310 and with a disk drive component on multiple systems, e.g. IBM 1130.
- IBM 2311: Disk drive using IBM 1316 disk pack (removable—7.5 MB)
- IBM 2312: Disk drive using IBM 2316 disk pack (removable—28.6 MB)
- IBM 2313: Disk facility with 4 disk drives using IBM 2316 disk pack (removable—28.6 MB)
- IBM 2314: Disk subsystem with 9 drives, one spare using IBM 2316 disk pack (removable—28.6 MB)
- IBM 2318: Disk facility with 2 disk drives using IBM 2316 disk pack (removable—28.6 MB)
- IBM 2319: Disk Facility with 3 disk drives using IBM 2316 disk pack (removable—28.6 MB)
  - IBM 2316: 28.6 MB Disk pack for 2314 et al.
- IBM 2321: Data cell drive. Drive with removable cells containing tape strips (400 MB)
- IBM 2421: IBM System Storage DS8000 Series with 1 year's warranty
- IBM 2422: IBM System Storage DS8000 Series with 2 years' warranty
- IBM 2423: IBM System Storage DS8000 Series with 3 years' warranty
- IBM 2424: IBM System Storage DS8000 Series with 4 years' warranty
- IBM 2810: IBM XIV Storage System (Generations 1 through 3; varies by model)
- IBM 2812: IBM XIV Storage System (Generations 1 through 3; varies by model)
- IBM 2851: IBM Scale-Out Network Attached Storage (SONAS)
- IBM 3310: Fixed FBA drive
- IBM 3330: Disk drive. (100 MB each spindle, up to 32 spindles per "subsystem"); 1970
  - IBM 3336: Disk pack for 3330–1, 3330–2; 1970
- IBM 3330-11: Disk drive. Double the density of 3330–1; 1973.
  - IBM 3336-11: Disk pack for 3330–11; 1973
- IBM 3333: Disk drive, a variant of 3330 and 3333-11
- IBM 3340: 'Winchester'-type disk drive, removable. Model -4, more?; 1973
  - IBM 3348: 35 or 70 MB data modules used with IBM 3340
- IBM 3344: Four 3340's simulated with a 3350 HDA under the covers
- IBM 3350: Disk drive (317.10 MB—1976)
- IBM 3363: Optical disk drive
- IBM 3370: FBA drive (used to store microcode and config info for the 3090. Connected through 3092); native DASD for 4331, 4361 (70 MB—1979).
- IBM 3375: Disk drive ("The Ugly Duckling" of IBM's DASD devices). 409.8 MB/actuator. First with dual-path access (via 'D' box)
- IBM 3380: Disk drive; 2.46 GB per each 2-drive module (1981), later double- and triple-density versions
- IBM 3390: Disk drive; 1, 2, 3 and 9 GB initially; later expanded to 27 GB
- IBM 3540: Diskette I/O unit
- IBM 3830: Storage control models 1, 2 and 3
- IBM 3850: Mass Storage System (MSS); virtual 3330-1 volumes, each backed up by a pair of cartridges, 1974
  - IBM 3830-11: Provided virtual 3330-1 (3330V) drives to the host; attached staging 3330 and 3350 drives for use by the 3851, 1974
  - IBM 3851: Mass Storage Facility. Robot arms retrieving cylindrical helically scanned tape cartridges.
- IBM 3880: Dual-channel DASD controller for 3350,3375,3380. 1981. Later models with up to 64MB cache. First hard disk cache in the industry.
- IBM 3990: Quad-channel DASD controller for 3390.
- IBM 4662: IBM FlashSystem 5200
- IBM 4963: Disk subsystem
- IBM 4964: Diskette unit for Series/1
- IBM 4965: Diskette drive and I/O expansion unit
- IBM 4966: Diskette magazine unit
- IBM 4967: High performance disk subsystem
- IBM 5444: Fixed/Removable disk file for System/3
- IBM 5445: Disk Storage for System/3
- IBM 5447: Disk Storage and Control for System/3
- IBM 7133: SSA Disk Enclosure (for RS/6000)
- IBM 7300: IBM 7070/IBM 7074 Disk Storage
- IBM 7320: Drum drive
- IBM 9331: 8" Floppy disk drive
- IBM 9332: Disk drive; 1986
- IBM 9333: Serial Link Disk Subsystem
- IBM 9335: Disk subsystem in a set of drawers. For AS/400, System 36/38 or 9370
- IBM 9337: Disk Array Subsystem; 1992
- IBM 9345: Disk Array Subsystem; employed commodity 5¼" hard drives; simulated 3390 hard disks but had a smaller track capacity

==== Magnetic tape storage ====
- IBM 050: Magnetic Data Inscriber (key operated, records on tape cartridge for IBM 2495 data entry into an IBM System 360)
- IBM 729: Magnetic tape drive (7 Track—6 data bits & 1 parity bit; 200/556/800 characters/inch)
- IBM 2401: Magnetic tape drive (7 Track—6 data bits & 1 parity bit; 200/556/800 characters/inch)
- IBM 2401: Magnetic tape drive (9 Track—8 data bits & 1 parity bit; 800/1600 characters/inch)
- IBM 2415: Magnetic tape drive (9 Track—8 data bits & 1 parity bit; 800/1600 characters/inch)
- IBM 2420: Magnetic tape drive (9 Track—8 data bits & 1 parity bit)
- IBM 2440: Magnetic tape drive (9 Track—8 data bits & 1 parity bit)
- IBM 2495: Tape Cartridge Reader (reads cartridges prepared on an IBM MT/ST or IBM 050 into an IBM System/360)
- IBM 3400-4: Lower density tape
- IBM 3400-6: Normal tape
- IBM 3410: Magnetic tape drive (9 Track—8 data bits & 1 parity bit); 1971
- IBM 3411: Magnetic tape unit and controller
- IBM 3420: Magnetic tape drive (9 Track—8 data bits & 1 parity bit)
- IBM 3422: Magnetic tape drive (9 Track—8 data bits & 1 parity bit); 1986
- IBM 3424: Tape unit. Brazil and SA only.
- IBM 3430: Top loading tape drive; 1983
- IBM 3440: Magnetic tape drive (9 Track—8 data bits & 1 parity bit)
- IBM 3480: Cartridge tape drive; 1984
- IBM 3490: Cartridge tape drive; 1991
- IBM 3494: Enterprise tape library
  - IBM Virtual Tape Server (VTS): tape virtualization engine for IBM 3494
- IBM 3495: Robotic tape library
- IBM 3573 models L2U, L3S, F3S: TS3100 Tape Library
- IBM 3573 models L4U, L2H, F3H: TS3200 Tape Library
- IBM 3576: TS3310 Tape Library
- IBM 3577: TS3400 Tape Library
- IBM 3580: LTO tape drive
- IBM 3584: TS3500 Tape Library
- IBM 3584: TS4500 Tape Library
- IBM 3588 model F3B: TS1030 Tape Drive; LTO3
- IBM 3588 model F4A: TS1040 Tape Drive; 2007; LTO4; TS2340 is a standalone version.
- IBM 3590: tape drive (Magstar)
- IBM 3592: TS1120 Tape Drive; model J1A known as Jaguar in 2004; model E05 in 2007
- IBM 3803: Magnetic tape drive (9 Track—8 data bits & 1 parity bit)
- IBM 3954: TS7510 and TS7520 Virtualization Engines
- IBM 3954: TS7510 and TS7520 Virtualization Engines
- IBM 3956: TS7740 Virtualization Engine; models CC6 and CX6
- IBM 3957: TS7700 Virtualization Engine; model V06
- IBM 4480: Cartridge drives which could be mounted by a robot
- IBM 4580: System/88 disk drive
- IBM 4581: System/88 disk drive
- IBM 4585: Autoload streaming magnetic tape unit
- IBM 4968: Autoload streaming magnetic tape unit
- IBM 6157: Streaming tape drive
- IBM 7208: 8-mm SCSI tape drive
- IBM 7330: Magnetic tape drive (7 Track—6 data bits & 1 parity bit; 200/556 characters/inch)
- IBM 7340: Hypertape
- IBM 8809: Magnetic tape unit
- IBM 9347: Magnetic tape drive (9 Track—8 data bits & 1 parity bit)
- IBM 9349: Magnetic tape drive (9 Track—8 data bits & 1 parity bit)

==== Optical storage ====
- IBM 1350: Photo Image Retrieval System
- IBM 1360: Photodigital Storage System (terabit)
  - IBM 1352: Cell File
  - IBM 1361: Cell File and Control
  - IBM 1364: Photo-Digital Reader
  - IBM 1365: Photo-Digital Recorder
  - IBM 1367: Data Controller
- IBM 3995: Optical Library (terabyte)

==== Storage networking and virtualization ====
- IBM 3044: Fiber optic channel extender link
- IBM 9034: ESCON/Parallel Converter
- IBM 2005: Storage area network (SAN) Fibre Channel switch (OEM from Brocade Communications Systems)
- IBM 2029: Dense Wavelength Division Multiplexer (OEM from Nortel)
- IBM 2031: Storage area network (SAN) Fibre Channel switch (OEM from McData)
- IBM 2032: Storage area network (SAN) Fibre Channel switch (OEM from McData)
- IBM 2053: Storage area network (SAN) Fibre Channel switch (OEM from Cisco)
- IBM 2054: Storage area network (SAN) Fibre Channel switch (OEM from Cisco)
- IBM 2061: Storage area network (SAN) Fibre Channel switch (OEM from Cisco)
- IBM 2062: Storage area network (SAN) Fibre Channel switch (OEM from Cisco)
- IBM 2103-H07: SAN Fibre Channel Hub
- IBM 2109: Storage area network (SAN) Fibre Channel switch (OEM from Brocade Communications Systems)
- IBM 2498: Storage area network (SAN) Fibre Channel switch (OEM from Brocade Communications Systems)
- IBM 2499: Storage area network (SAN) Fibre Channel switch (OEM from Brocade Communications Systems)
- IBM 3534: Storage area network (SAN) Fibre Channel switch (OEM from Brocade Communications Systems)
- IBM SAN File System: a software for sharing file systems in SAN
- IBM 2145: System Storage SAN Volume Controller (SVC)
- IBM 9729: Optical Wavelength Division Multiplexer

=== Coprocessor units ===
- IBM 2938: Array processor; attach to 2044 (model 1) or 2165 (model 2)
- IBM 3092: IBM 3090 Processor controller
- IBM 3838: Array processor; 1976
- IBM 4758: PCI Cryptographic Coprocessor
- IBM 4764: PCI-X Cryptographic Coprocessor
- IBM 4765: PCIe Cryptographic Coprocessor
- IBM 4767: PCIe Cryptographic Coprocessor (Crypto Express5S [CEX5S] on Z, MTM 4767–002, FC EJ32/EJ33 on Power)
- IBM 4768: PCIe Cryptographic Coprocessor (Crypto Express6S [CEX6S] on Z)
- IBM 4769: PCIe Cryptographic Coprocessor (Crypto Express7S [CEX7S] on Z)

=== Channels and input/output control units ===
- IBM 2820: Drum Storage Control Unit for 2301 Drum Storage Units
- IBM 2821: Control unit (for 2540 Reader/Punch and 1403 Printer)
- IBM 2822: Paper Tape Reader Control
- IBM 2835: Control unit model 1 (for 2305-1 Disk)
- IBM 2835: Control unit model 2 (for 2305-2 Disk)
- IBM 2841: DASD Control unit (for 2311, 2302, 2303, 2321 and 7320)
- IBM 2846: Channel controller for System/360 Model 67
- IBM 2860: Selector Channel (for SYS/360 2065 & above, 370/165, 168 and 195)
- IBM 2870: Multiplex Channel (for SYS/360 2065 & above, 370/165, 168 and 195)
- IBM 2880: Block Multiplex Channel (for 360/85 and 195, 370/165, 168, 195)
- IBM 2914: Switching Unit (for manually switching channels between central processing units)
- IBM 3088: Multisystem channel communications unit
- IBM 3172: LAN Interconnect Controller (or Nways Interconnect Controller)
- IBM 3814: Switching Management System
- IBM 4959: I/O expansion unit
- IBM 4987: Programmable communication subsystem
- IBM 5085: Graphics Processor. Part of IBM 5080 Graphics System.
- IBM 5088: Graphics Channel Controller. Part of IBM 5080 Graphics System.
- IBM 5209: 5250-3270 link protocol converter
- IBM 7299: Active Star Hub for twinax terminals
- IBM 7426: Terminal interface unit
- IBM 7621: Tape Control
- IBM 7909: Data Channel
- IBM 8102: Storage and I/O unit for 8100 Information System

=== Data communications devices ===
- IBM 3270
  - IBM 3178: Display station for IBM 3270
  - IBM 3179: Display station (color or graphics) for IBM 3270
  - IBM 3180: Monochrome display station, configurable to 80 columns (24, 32 or 43 rows), 132 columns (27 rows)
  - IBM 3191: Monochrome display station
  - IBM 3192G: Terminal. 24 or 32 lines. Graphics.
  - IBM 3193: Display station
  - IBM 3194: Advanced function color display
  - IBM 3196: Display station
  - IBM 3197: Color display work station
  - IBM 3279: Color graphic terminal; 1979
  - IBM 3290: Gas panel display terminal with 62x160 screen configurable with one to four logical screens, each of which could be further subdivided into partitions under software control; 1983
  - IBM 3174: 3270 Subsystem controller
  - IBM 3271: Remote 3270 control unit
  - IBM 3272: Local 3270 control unit
  - IBM 3274: 3270 Control unit
  - IBM 3275: Display station
  - IBM 3276: 3270 Control unit display station
  - IBM 3277: Terminal
  - IBM 3278: Display station
  - IBM 3299: 3270 Terminal Multiplexer
- IBM 1009: IBM 1401/1440/1414/1460 Data Transmission Unit
- IBM 1013: Card Transmission Terminal
- IBM 1015: Inquiry/Display Terminal
- IBM 2210: NWays Multiprotocol Router (router)
- IBM 2217: NWays Multiprotocol Concentrator
- IBM 2250: Vector Graphics Display Terminal
- IBM 2260: CRT Terminal
- IBM 2265: Display Station
- IBM 2701: Data Adapter Unit (communication controller)
- IBM 2702: Transmission Control (communication controller)
- IBM 2703: Transmission Control (communication controller)
- IBM 2740: Typewriter communication terminal; 1965
- IBM 2741: Typewriter communication terminal; 1965
- IBM 2770: Data Communications System; 1969
  - IBM 2772: Multi-Purpose Control Unit: 1969
- IBM 2922: Programmable terminal; 1972
- IBM 2840: Display unit
- IBM 3101: ASCII display station
- IBM 3102: Thermal printer for attachment to IBM 3101, 3151, 3161, etc.
- IBM 3104: Display station for attachment to IBM 5250
- IBM 2840: Display Control Unit Model I for 2250 Model-II Analog Displays
- IBM 2840: Display Control Unit Model II for 2250 Model III Analog Displays
- IBM 2848: Display Controller (for 2260)
- IBM 3151: ASCII display station
- IBM 3161: ASCII display station
- IBM 3163: ASCII display station
- IBM 3164: ASCII color display station
- IBM 3192: Monochrome display station, configurable to 80 columns (24, 32 or 43 rows), 132 columns (27 rows). Record and playback keystrokes function. All configuration done through keyboard.
- IBM 3486: 3487, 3488 "Info Window" twinax displays
- IBM 3735: Programmable Buffered Terminal
- IBM 3767: Communication terminal
- IBM 3780: Data communications terminal; 1972
  - IBM 3781: Card Punch (optional)
- IBM 3770: Data Communication system. All Terminals came with integrated desk
  - IBM 3771: Communication Terminal Models 1, 2 and 3
  - IBM 3773: Communication Terminal Models 1, P1, 2, P2, 3 and P3
  - IBM 3774: Communication Terminal Models 1, P1, 2 and P2
  - IBM 3775: Communication Terminal Models 1 and P1
  - IBM 3776: Communication Terminal Models 1 and
  - IBM 3777: Communication Terminal Model 1
  - IBM 3783: Card Attachment Unit, attached 2502 or 3521 to any 3770 terminal except 3777
  - IBM 3784: Line Printer, optional second printer for the 3774
- IBM 7740: Communication control unit; 1963
- IBM 7750: Transmission Control Unit (Note: Used by CTSS)
- IBM 3704: Communication Controller
- IBM 3705: Communication Controller
- IBM 3708: Network control unit
- IBM 3710: Network Controller
- IBM 3720: Communication Controller
- IBM 3721: Expansion unit for IBM 3720
- IBM 3724: Controller
- IBM 3725: Communication Controller
- IBM 3728: Communication control matrix switch
- IBM 3745: High-speed communication controller; 1988. Model -410, more?
- IBM 3746: Multiprotocol Controller
- IBM 5250: CRT terminal; 1977
- IBM 5251: Display Station
- IBM 5252: Dual display CRT terminal; 1978
- IBM 7171: ASCII Device Attachment Control Unit (S/370 Channel-attached protocol converter for mapping ASCII display screens to IBM 3270 format)

=== Power supply/distribution units ===
- IBM 3089: IBM 3081/IBM 3090 Power controller. 50 Hz → 400 kHz

=== Modems ===
- IBM 3833: Modem; 1985
- IBM 3834: Modem; 1985
- IBM 3863: Modem
- IBM 3864: Modem
- IBM 3865: Modem
- IBM 3868: Rack-mounted modem
- IBM 5810: Limited-distance multi-modem enclosure (for 5811 and 5812)
- IBM 5811: Limited-distance modem
- IBM 5812: Limited-distance modem
- IBM 5841: 1,200-bit/s modem
- IBM 5842: 2,400-bit/s modem; 1986
- IBM 5865: Modem
- IBM 5866: Modem
- IBM 5868: Rack mounted modem

=== Magnetic ink and optical readers ===
- IBM 1210: Magnetic character-reader/sorter; 1959
- IBM 1219: Reader/sorter (to sort things like postal orders); 1961
- IBM 1230: Test Scoring
- IBM 1231: Optical Mark Page Reader
- IBM 1232: Optical Mark Page Reader
- IBM 1255: Magnetic Character Reader
- IBM 1259: Magnetic Character Reader
- IBM 1270: Optical Reader Sorter
- IBM 1275: Optical Reader Sorter
- IBM 1285: IBM 1401/1440/1460/Sys360 Optical Reader for printed numbers
- IBM 1287: S/360 Optical Reader for handwritten numbers
- IBM 1288: S/360 Optical Page Reader for hand written numbers and OCR-A Font
- IBM 1412: Magnetic Character Reader
- IBM 1418: IBM 1401/1460/Sys360—Optical Reader
- IBM 1419: IBM 1401/1410/Sys360—Magnetic Character Reader
- IBM 1428: IBM 1401/1460/Sys360—Optical Reader
- IBM 1975: Optical Page Reader (Used at SSA from 1965 to 1977)
- IBM 2956-2: Optical Mark/Hole Reader
- IBM 2956-3: Optical Mark/Hole Reader
- IBM 2956-5: Multi-Pocket MCR Reader Sorter (RPQ W19976)
- IBM 3881: Optical Mark Reader
- IBM 3886: Optical Character Reader
- IBM 3890: Document processor
- IBM 3897: Image capture system
- IBM 3898: Image processor

=== Other ===
- IBM 2721: Portable Audio Terminal
- IBM 3117: Image scanner
- IBM 3118: Image scanner
- IBM 4577: System/88 expansion cabinet
- IBM 4993: Series/1-S/370 termination enclosure
- IBM 4997: Rack enclosure
- IBM 7170: Device attachment control unit
- IBM 7770: Audio Response Unit
- IBM 7772: Audio Response Unit
- IBM 9037: Sysplex Timer

=== IBM PC components and peripherals ===
- IBM 2215: 15" Multisync Color Monitor with Digital Controls 65 kHz for Asia Pacific
- IBM 4707: Monochrome monitor for Wheelwriter word processor
- IBM 5144: PC convertible monochrome display
- IBM 5145: PC convertible color display
- IBM 5151: IBM PC Display—Monochrome (green) CRT monitor, designed for MDA (1981)
- IBM 5152: IBM PC Graphics Printer (technically this was an Epson MX-80 dot matrix printer (1979), but it was IBM-labelled (1981)
- IBM 5153: IBM PC Color Display—CRT monitor, designed for CGA (1983)
- IBM 5154: IBM Enhanced Color Display—for EGA (1984)
- IBM 5161: Expansion Unit for the IBM PC, a second chassis that was connected via ISA bus extender and receiver cards and a 60-pin cable connector; the Expansion Unit had its own power supply with enough wattage to drive up to two hard drives (the IBM 5150's original power supply was insufficient for hard drives) (1981–1987?)
- IBM 5173: PC Network baseband extender
- IBM 5175: IBM Professional Graphics Controller (PGC, PGA) (1984)
- IBM 5181: Personal Computer Compact Printer
- IBM 5182: Personal Computer Color Printer
- IBM 5201: Quietwriter Printer Model 2
- IBM 5202: Quietwriter III printer
- IBM 6312: PS/ValuePoint Color Display
- IBM 6314: PS/ValuePoint Color Display
- IBM 6317: Color display
- IBM 6319: PS/ValuePoint Color Display
- IBM 6324: Color display
- IBM 6325: Color display
- IBM 6327: Color display
- IBM 8503: Monochrome monitor for PC
- IBM 8507: PS/2 monochrome display
- IBM 8512: PS/2 color display
- IBM 8513: PS/2 color display
- IBM 8514: PS/2 large color display
- IBM 8514/A: Display adaptor
- IBM T220/T221 LCD monitors: 9503 Ultra-high resolution monitor
- IBM 9521: Monitor
- IBM 9524: Monitor
- IBM 9525: Monitor
- IBM 9527: Monitor
- IBM E74: CRT monitor, ca 2001
- IBM E74M: CRT monitor with built-in speakers and microphone (model no. 6517-U7N) ca 2001
- IBM PC keyboard (84 keys)(1981)
- IBM PC keyboard (101 keys) Enhanced (1984)
- Monochrome Display Adapter (MDA)
- Color Graphics Adapter (CGA)
- Enhanced Graphics Adapter (EGA)
- Professional Graphics controller (PGC)
- Multicolor Graphics Adapter (MCGA)
- Video Graphics Array (VGA)
- Micro Channel architecture (MCA): 32-bit expansion bus for PS/2
- Mwave
- IBM Deskstar, Travelstar and Ultrastar series of hard disk drives for desktops and laptops, respectively (Acquired by hard disk drive division of Hitachi)

== Embedded systems, application-specific machines/systems ==
=== Airline reservation systems ===
- Deltamatic: Delta Air Lines reservations system
- PANAMAC: Pan American World Airways reservations system
- Programmed Airline Reservations System (PARS): airline reservations system
- Sabre: reservations system, originally used by American Airlines
- IBM 9081: airlines version of the 3081
- IBM 9083: airlines version of the 3083
- IBM 9190: airlines version of the 3090

=== Bank and finance ===
- IBM 801: Proof Machine
- IBM 802: Proof Machine, 24 pockets
- IBM 803: Proof Machine, 32 pockets; 1949 to 1981, a product for 32 years
- IBM 1201: Proof Inscriber. Proofing machine that was also an inscriber
- IBM 1202: Utility Inscriber, an electric type-writer, used to inscribe documents with magnetic ink
- IBM 1203: Unit Inscriber (keyoperated, print on checks, etc. with magnetic ink)
- IBM 1206: Unit Inscriber (CMC-7 encoder)
- IBM 1240: Banking system; 1963
  - IBM 1241: Bank Processing Unit
- IBM 1260: Electronic Inscriber (keyoperated for proving deposits, sorting and listing of checks)
- IBM 1420: High-speed Bank Transit System; 1962
- IBM 1450: Data Processing System for small banks; 1968
- IBM 2730: Transaction validation terminal; 1971
- IBM 2984: Cash dispensing terminal (ATM); 1972
- IBM 3600: Finance Communication System; 1973
  - IBM 3601: Branch Controller
  - IBM 3602: Branch Controller
  - IBM 3604: Teller Terminal (Keyboard/Magnetic Swipe/Display/Optional PINpad)
  - IBM 3606: Teller Terminal (Keyboard/Magnetic Swipe/Display)
  - IBM 3608: Printer with Keyboard and Display
  - IBM 3610: Document Printer
  - IBM 3611: Passbook Printer
  - IBM 3612: Document/Passbook Printer
  - IBM 3614: Automatic teller machine (ATM aka CTF); 1973
  - IBM 3615: Administrative Printer
  - IBM 3616: Journal Printer
  - IBM 3618: Administrative Line Printer (155 lpm, first IBM band printer)
  - IBM 3619: Line Printer ('Australian' administrative printer version)
  - IBM 3620: Magnetic Stripe Reader Encoder and Journal/Document Printer
  - IBM 3621: Statement Printer with Magnetic Stripe Reader and optional Keyboard/PINpad
  - IBM 3624: Through-the-wall ATM; 1979
- IBM 3670: Brokerage communications system; 1971
  - IBM 3671: Shared Terminal Control Unit
  - IBM 3672: Executive Console
  - IBM 3673: Data Display
  - IBM 3674: Printer-Keyboard
- IBM 3895: Deposit processing system; 1978
- IBM 3940: Banking Terminal
- IBM 3980: Bank Teleprocessing System: 1968
  - IBM 3981: Computing Concentrator
  - IBM 3982: Keyboard Terminal
- IBM 4700: Branch Banking Equipment; 1981
  - IBM 4701: Branch Controller (8" floppy disc)
  - IBM 4702: Branch Controller (5¼" HD floppy disc; hard disc)
  - IBM 4704: Teller Terminal (Keyboard/Magnetic Swipe/Display/Optional PINpad)
  - IBM 4710: Journal/Cutform Printer
  - IBM 4712: Journal/Cutform Printer
  - IBM 4713: Verification Printer
  - IBM 4715: Printer
  - IBM 4720: Cutform/Passbook Printer
  - IBM 4722: Passbook Printer
  - IBM 4723: Document Processor
  - IBM 4730: Counter-style Personal Banking Machine (PBM); 1983
  - IBM 4731: In-lobby PBM; 1983
  - IBM 4732: In-lobby PBM; 1987
  - IBM 4736: Cash-only PBM
  - IBM 4737: Self-service transaction station
  - IBM 4781: Table Top ATM; 1991 (re-badged Diebold 1060)
  - IBM 4782: In-lobby ATM; 1991 (re-badged Diebold 1062)
  - IBM 4783: Cash-only ATM; 1991 (re-badged Diebold 1064)
  - IBM 4785: Exterior ATM; 1991 (re-badged Diebold 1072)
  - IBM 4786: Exterior Cash-only ATM; 1991 (re-badged Diebold 1071)
  - IBM 4787: Exterior Drive-up ATM; 1991 (re-badged Diebold 1073)
  - IBM 4788: Exterior Self-standing Cash-only ATM; 1991 (re-badged Diebold 1074)
  - IBM 4789: Cash-only ATM; 1991 (re-badged Diebold 1063)
  - IBM 5922: Low-speed magnetic ink character recognition (MICR) Reader
- IBM 5995: Branch Controller

=== Computer-aided drafting (CAD) ===
- IBM 7361: Fastdraft System; 1982, a low-cost drafting system using a light pen and a CRT screen
  - IBM 7361: Graphics Processor Unit
  - IBM 3251: Graphics Display Station Model 2

=== Word processing ===
- IBM MT/ST: Magnetic Tape/Selectric Typewriter; 1964
- IBM MC/ST: Magnetic Card/Selectric Typewriter (Mag Card); 1969
- IBM Displaywriter System; 1980
  - IBM 6360: IBM Displaywriter: Diskette Unit
  - IBM 6361: IBM Displaywriter: Mag Card Unit
  - IBM 6580: IBM Displaywriter: Display Station
- IBM Office System/6
  - IBM 6/420: stand-alone information processing unit; part of the Office System/6; 1978
  - IBM 6/430: information processor; part of the Office System/6; 1977
  - IBM 6/440: information processor; part of the Office System/6; 1977
  - IBM 6/442: information processor; part of the Office System/6; 1978
  - IBM 6/450: information processor; part of the Office System/6; 1977
  - IBM 6/452: information processor; part of the Office System/6; 1978

=== Other document processing ===
- IBM 1282: Optical reader card punch
- IBM 3740: Data entry system; 1973
  - IBM 3741: Data Station Models 1 and 2, Programmable Work Stations Models 3 and 4
  - IBM 3742: Dual Data Station
  - IBM 3713: Printer
  - IBM 3715: Printer
  - IBM 3717: Printer
  - IBM 3747: Data Converter
- IBM 3694: Document Processor; 1980
- IBM 3881: Optical Mark Reader; 1972
- IBM 3886: Optical Character Reader; 1972
- IBM 3890: Document Processor; 1973
- IBM 3891: Document Processor; 1989
- IBM 3892: Document Processor; 1987
- IBM 3895: Document Reader/Inscriber; 1977
- IBM 5321: Mag Card Unit for System/32; 1976
- IBM 6640: Document printer; 1976; in 1977 reassigned being part of the Office System/6
- IBM 9370: Document reproducer; 1966

=== Educational ===
- IBM 1500: Computer-assisted instruction system; 1966
  - IBM 1510: Display Console
  - IBM 1512: Image Projector

=== Government: avionics, computation, command and control, and space systems ===
- IBM Relay Calculator: aka The IBM Pluggable Sequence Relay Calculator (Aberdeen Machine), 1944
- IBM NORC: Naval Ordnance Research Calculator; 1954
- AN/FSQ-7: computer for the Semi-Automatic Ground Environment; 1959 (IBM had the manufacturing contract.)
  - IBM 728: Magnetic Tape Reader/Recorder (7 Track—6 data bits & 1 synchronization bit; 248 characters/inch)
- AN/FSQ-8 Combat Control Central: variant of the AN/FSQ-7
- AN/FSQ-31V: US Air Force Command and Control Data Processing Element for SACCS; 1959–1960
  - IBM 4020: IBM id for the AN/FSQ-31V
- AN/FSQ-32: SAGE Solid State Computer
- IBM 2361: NASA's Manned Spacecraft Center IBM 7094 II Core Storage Unit (524288—36-bit words); 1964
- ASC-15 Titan II Guidance Computer
- Gemini Guidance Computer
- Saturn Guidance Computer
- Saturn instrument unit
- IBM System/4 Pi: avionics computers; military and NASA; 1967
  - Skylab Onboard Computers
  - Space Shuttle General Purpose Computer
  - AN/ASQ-155 computer
- IBM RAD6000: Radiation-hardened single board computer, based on the IBM RISC Single Chip CPU
- ASCI White Supercomputer: Built as stage three of the Accelerated Strategic Computing Initiative (ASCI) started by the U.S. Department of Energy and the National Nuclear Security Administration
- IBM 7950: Cryptanalytic computer using 7030 as CPU; 1962 (Harvest)
  - IBM 7951: IBM 7950 Stream coprocessor
  - IBM 7952: IBM 7950 High performance core storage (1024—72-bit words: 64 data bits & 8 ECC bits)
  - IBM 7955: IBM 7950 Tractor Magnetic tape system (22 Track—16 data bits & 6 ECC bits; 2,400 words/inch)
  - IBM 7959: IBM 7950 High-speed I/O exchange
- IBM 9020: for FAA and one system for the UK CAA.
  - IBM 7201: enhanced 2065 (S/360-65) used as a Computing Element (CE) in the IBM 9020 complex
  - IBM 7231: enhanced 2050 (S/360-50) used as an Input Output Control Element (IOCE) in the IBM 9020 complex
  - IBM 7251: 512KiB (byte = 8 bits + P) core Storage Element (SE) used in the IBM 9020 complex
  - IBM 7289-02: Peripheral Adapter Module (PAM) used in the IBM 9020D complex
  - IBM 7289-04: Display Element (DE) used in the IBM 9020E complex
  - IBM 7262: System Console (SC) used in the IBM 9020D complex
  - IBM 7265: Configuration Console (CC) used in the IBM 9020E complex

=== Industry and manufacturing ===
- IBM 357: Data Collection system; 1959
  - IBM 013: Badge Punch
  - IBM 024/026: Card Punch (81 col)
  - IBM 357: Input Station (Badge and/or serial card reader)
  - IBM 358: Input Control Unit
  - IBM 360: Clock Read-Out Control
  - IBM 361: Read-Out Clock
  - IBM 372: Manual Entry
  - IBM 373: Punch Switch
  - IBM 374: Cartridge Reader
- IBM 1001: Data Transmission Terminal; 1960
- IBM 1030: Data Collection system; 1963
  - IBM 1031: Input Station.
  - IBM 1032: Digital Time Unit.
  - IBM 1033: Printer.
  - IBM 1034: Card Punch
  - IBM 1035: Badge Reader
- IBM 1050: Data Communications System; 1963
  - IBM 1026: Transmission Control Unit
  - IBM 1051: Central Control Unit
  - IBM 1052: Printer-Keyboard, based on Selectric mechanism
  - IBM 1053: Console Printer, based on Selectric mechanism
  - IBM 1054: Paper Tape Reader
  - IBM 1055: Paper Tape Punch
  - IBM 1057: Punched Card Output
  - IBM 1058: Printing Card Punch Output
  - IBM 1092: Programmed Keyboard (keyboard storage for input to 1050)
  - IBM 1093: Programmed Keyboard (used in tandem with 1092 for transmission to 24/26 or 7770)
- IBM 1060: Data Communications System
  - IBM 1026: Transmission Control Unit
- IBM 1070: Process Communication System; 1964
  - IBM 1026: IBM 1030/1050/1060/1070 Transmission Control Unit
  - IBM 1071: Terminal Control Unit
  - IBM 1072: Terminal Multiplexer
  - IBM 1073: Latching Contact Operate Model 1
  - IBM 1073: Counter Terminal Model 2
  - IBM 1073: Digital-Pulse Converter Model 3
  - IBM 1074: Binary Display
  - IBM 1075: Decimal Display
  - IBM 1076: Manual Binary Input
  - IBM 1077: Manual Decimal Input
  - IBM 1078: Pulse Counter
- IBM 1080: Data Acquisition System
  - IBM 1081: DAS Control...for analytical applications
  - IBM 1082: Punched Card Input
  - IBM 1083: Remote Control (provides Operator Scan Request)
  - IBM 1084: Sampler Reader (Technicon Sampler 40)
  - IBM 1055: Paper Tape Punch
  - IBM 1057: Punched Card Output
  - IBM 1058: Printing Card Punch Output
- IBM 1710: Control system based on IBM 1620; 1961
  - IBM 1620: IBM 1710 Central Processing Unit
  - IBM 1711: IBM 1710 Data Converter (A/D)
  - IBM 1712: IBM 1710 Multiplexer and Terminal Unit
- IBM 1720: Control system based on IBM 1620; 1961
- IBM 1800: Process control variant of the IBM 1130; 1964
- IBM 2790: Data Communications System; 1969
  - IBM 2715: Transmission controller
  - IBM 2791: Area Station
  - IBM 2793: Area Station
  - IBM 2795: Data Entry Unit
  - IBM 2796: Data Entry Unit
  - IBM 2797: Data Entry Unit
  - IBM 2798: Guided Display Unit
- IBM 3630: Plant Communications System; 1978
- IBM 3730: Distributed office communication system; 1978
- IBM Series/1: brand name for process control computers; 1976
  - IBM 4953: Series/1 processor model 3; 1976
  - IBM 4954: Series/1 processor model 4
  - IBM 4955: Series/1 processor model 5; 1976
  - IBM 4956: Series/1 processor model 6
  - IBM 4982: Sensor I/O unit
- IBM 5010: System/7 processor; industrial control; 1970
  - IBM 5012: Multifunction Module
  - IBM 5013: Digital Input/Output Module
  - IBM 5014: Analog Input Module
  - IBM 5022: Disk Storage Unit
  - IBM 5025 Enclosure
  - IBM 5028: Operator Station
  - IBM 5010E: System/7 Maritime Application/Bridge System; 1974
    - IBM 5090: N01 Radar Navigation Interface Module
    - IBM 5090: N02 Bridge Console
    - IBM 5026: C03 Enclosure (vibration hardened)
- IBM 5230: Data Collection system;
  - IBM 5231: Controller Models 1,2, and 3
  - IBM 5234: Time Entry Station Models 1 and 2
  - IBM 5235: Data Entry Station
  - IBM 5230: Data Collection System Accessory Package
- IBM 5275: Direct Numerical Control Station; 1973
- IBM 5531: Industrial computer for plant environments; 1984
- IBM 5937: Industrial Terminal; 1976
- IBM 7531: Industrial computer; 1985
- IBM 7532: Industrial computer; 1985
- IBM 7535: Industrial robotic system; 1982
- IBM 7552: Industrial computer; 1986
- IBM 7565: Industrial robotic system; 1982
- IBM 7700: Data Acquisition System, not marketed; 1964
- IBM 9003: Industrial computer; 1985

=== Medical/science/lab equipment ===
- IBM 2991: Blood cell separator; 1972; model 2 1976
- IBM 2997: Blood cell separator; 1977
- IBM 5880: Electrocardiograph system; 1978
- IBM 9630: Gas chromograph; 1985

=== Research/advertising (not product) machines ===
- IBM Columbia Difference Tabulator: 1931
- IBM ASCC: Automatic Sequence Controlled Calculator (aka. Harvard Mark I); 1944
- IBM SSEC: Selective Sequence Electronic Calculator; 1948
- IBM Deep Blue: Chess playing computer developed for 1997 match with Garry Kasparov
- IBM Watson: An artificially intelligent computer system capable of answering questions posed in natural language, specifically developed to answer questions on the quiz show Jeopardy!.

=== Retail/point-of-sale (POS) ===
- IBM 3650: Retail Store System; 1973
  - IBM 3651: Store Controller
    - IBM 7480: Store Controller (RPQ)
    - IBM 7481: Data Storage Unit (RPQ)
  - IBM 3653: Point of Sale Terminal
  - IBM 3657: Ticket Unit
  - IBM 3659: Remote Communications Unit
  - IBM 3784: Line Printer
- IBM 3660: Supermarket System; 1973
  - IBM 3651: Store Controller Model A60 or B60
  - IBM 3661: Store Controller
  - IBM 3663: Supermarket Terminal; 1973
  - IBM 3666 Checkout Scanner
  - IBM 3669: Store Communications Unit
- IBM 3680: Programmable Store System
  - IBM 3683 Point of Sale Terminal
  - IBM 3684 Point of Sale Control Unit
  - IBM 3685 Display Control Unit
  - IBM 3686 Display Station
  - IBM 3687 Checkout Scanner
  - IBM 3689 Store Communications Unit
- IBM 4610: SureMark Retail Printer
- IBM 4680: Store System
  - IBM 4683: Point of Sale Terminal
  - IBM 4684: Point of Sale Terminal
- IBM 4693: PC Based Retail System
- IBM 4694: PC Based Retail System
- IBM 5260: Retail System
  - IBM 5265: Point of Sale Terminal
  - IBM 5266: Point of Sale Terminal
- IBM SurePOS 300: Cost effective PC Based Retail System
- IBM SurePOS 500: All in one PC Based Retail System
- IBM SurePOS 700: High performance PC Based Retail System
- IBM SureOne: PC Based Retail System
- AnyPlace POS: Customer touch screen kiosk
- BART (Bay Area Rapid Transport) fare collection machines; 1972

=== Telecommunications ===
- International Time Recording Co. Series 970: Telephone System (1930s)
- SAIS (Semi-Automatic Intercept System): Added automated custom intercept messages to the Bell System's operator-based centralized intercept system, using a computer-controlled magnetic drum audio playback medium. Late 1960s.
- IBM 1750: Switching System
- IBM 1755: Operator station
- IBM 2750: Switching System
- IBM 3750: Switching System
- IBM 3755: Operator Desk
- IBM 8750: Business Communications System (ROLM)
- IBM 9750: Business Communications System (ROLM)
- IBM 9751: CBX: Main component of 9750 system
- IBM Simon: Smartphone; 1994

=== Unclassified ===
- IBM TouchMobile a hand-held computer announced in 1993

== Computer software ==
Some software listings are for software families, not products (Fortran was not a product; Fortran H was a product).

Some IBM software products were distributed free (no charge for the software itself, a common practice early in the industry). The term "Program Product" was used by IBM to denote that the software is generally available (Note: Unlike a PRPQ.) at an additional charge. Prior to June 1969, the majority of software packages written by IBM were available at no charge to IBM customers; with the June 1969 announcement, new software not designated as "System Control Programming" became Program Products, although existing non-system software remained available for free.

=== Operating systems ===
- AIX, IBM's family of proprietary UNIX OS's (Advanced Interactive eXecutive) on multiple platforms
- BPS/360 (Basic Programming Support/360)
- BOS/360 (Basic Operating System/360)
- TOS/360 (Tape Operating System/360)
- DM2, Disk Monitor System Version 2 for the IBM 1130
- DOS/360 (Disk Operating System/360)
- DOS/VS (Disk Operating System/Virtual Storage—370), virtual memory successor to DOS/360
  - DOS/VSE (Virtual Storage Extended—370, 4300)
  - VSE/AF (VSE/Advanced Functions) enhancements to DOS/VSE
  - VSE/SP (VSE/System Package), integrates DOS/VSE, VSE/AF and other products, replaces SSX/VSE
  - VSE/ESA (Virtual Storage Extended/Enterprise System Architecture), replaces VSE/SP
  - z/VSE for z/Architecture
- DPCX (Distributed Processing Control eXecutive) for IBM 8100
- DPPX (Distributed Processing Programming eXecutive) for IBM 8100 and, later, the ES/9370
- CPF (Control Program Facility) for the System/38
- IBM i, previously i5/OS and OS/400, successor to CPF for AS/400, IBM Power Systems, and PureSystems
- IBSYS/IBJOB (IBM 7090/94 operating system)
- IX/370 An IBM proprietary UNIX OS (Interactive eXecutive for IBM System/370)
- Model 44 Programming System for the System/360 Model 44
- OS/360 (Operating System/360 for IBM System/360)
  - PCP (Primary Control Program option)
  - MFT (Multiprogramming with a Fixed number of Tasks option)
  - MVT (Multiprogramming with a Variable number of Tasks option)
    - M65MP (Model 65 Multiprocessor option)
- OS/VS1 (Operating System—Virtual Storage 1) for IBM System/370, virtual memory successor to MFT
- OS/VS2 (Operating System—Virtual Storage 2) for IBM System/370, virtual memory successor to MVT
  - SVS: Release 1 (Single Virtual Storage)
  - MVS: Release 2–3.8 (Multiple Virtual address Spaces)
    - MVS/370 (OS/VS2 2.0-3.8, MVS/SE, MVS/SP V1)
      - MVS/SE: MVS System Extensions
        - Release 1: based on OS/VS2 R3.7 plus selectable units
        - Release 2: based on OS/VS2 R3.8 plus selectable units
      - MVS/SP V1: MVS/System Product, replacement for MVS/SE
    - MVS/XA (Multiple Virtual Systems—Extended Architecture): MVS/SP V2
    - MVS/ESA (Multiple Virtual Systems—Enterprise Systems Architecture)
      - MVS/SP V3
      - MVS/ESA SP V4
      - MVS/ESA SP V5
- OS/390, successor to MVS/ESA for IBM System/390
- z/OS, successor to OS/390 for z/Architecture and, up through Version 1.5, System/390
- OS/2 (Operating System/2) for the IBM PS/2 and other x86 systems
- PC DOS (Personal Computer Disk Operating System)
- System Support Program for System/34, System/36
- Transaction Processing Facility (TPF), formerly IBM Airline Control Program (ACP)
- z/TPF, successor to TPF
- TSS/360 (Time Sharing System, a failed predecessor to VM/CMS, intended for the IBM System/360 Model 67)
- CP-67 May refer to either a package for the 360/67 or only to the Control program of that package.
- CP/CMS Another name for the CP-67 package for the 360/67; predecessor to VM.
- VM, sometimes called VM/CMS (Virtual Machine/Conversational Monitor System) Successor systems to CP-67 for the S/370 and later machines. First appeared as Virtual Machine Facility/370 and most recently as z/VM.
  - VM/SE Virtual Machine/System Extension, also known as System Extension Program Product (SEPP). An enhancement to Virtual Machine Facility/370, replaced by VM/SP.
  - VM/BSE Virtual Machine/Basic System Extension, also known as Basic System Extension Program Product (BSEPP). An enhancement to Virtual Machine Facility/370, providing some of the facilities of VM/se, replaced by VM/SP.
  - VM/SP Virtual Machine/System Product, replacing VM/SE and the base for all future VM versions.
  - VM/XA Virtual Machine/Extended Architecture 31-bit VM
    - VM/XA MA (Virtual machine/Extended architecture Migration Aid)
    - VM/XA SF (Virtual Machine/Extended Architecture Systems Facility), successor to VM/XA MA
    - VM/XA SP (Virtual Machine/Extended Architecture Systems Product), successor to VM/XA SF
  - VM/ESA (Virtual Machine/Enterprise System Architecture), successor to VM/XA
  - z/VM, successor to VM/ESA
- 4690 OS (retail)

=== Utilities and languages ===
- A20 handler for the PC (address line 20 handler)
- Ada
- ALGOL 60
  - ALGOL F compiler for OS/360
- APL
  - IBM APL implementations
  - IBM APL2 implementations
- Autocoder macro assemblers for various machines, with nothing in common but the name
- COBOL
  - IBM COBOL compilers
- IBM Compilers (formerly VisualAge compilers (C/C++, Fortran, Java, et al.))
- Conversational Programming System (CPS), an early time-sharing system on OS/360.
- CSP (Cross System Product)
- Document Composition Facility (DCF) A package that contains SCRIPT/VS, the GML Starter Set (GMLSS) and supporting files.
- Eclipse an IDE
- EGL (Enterprise Generation Language)
- FARGO (Fourteen-o-one Automatic Report Generation Operation). Predecessor of RPG for the IBM 1401
- FAP assembler for the IBM 709, 7090, and 7094 (FORTRAN Assembly Program)
- FORTRAN (originally developed by IBM for the 704) (FORmula TRANslator)
- Generalized Markup Language (GML) A document markup language, part of Document Composition Facility (DCF)
  - BookMaster An enhanced version of the GML Starter Set (GMLSS) in DCF
  - BookManager BUILD/MVS and BookManager BUILD/VM An enhanced version of BookMaster.
- IBM Information Access Gave customers access to the Retain and PTF databases, circa 1981
- ISPF Interactive System Productivity Facility. An IDE for MVS and z/OS systems
- JCL batch job language for OS/360 and successors
- JES1, JES2 and JES3, job entry and spooling subsystems
- MAP (Macro Assembly Program in the IBJOB component of IBSYS)
- Pascal
- PL/I (Programming Language/One)
  - PL/I F compiler for OS/360 and PL/I D compiler for DOS/360
  - PL/I Optimizing Compiler and PL/I Checkout Compiler
  - IBM Enterprise PL/I
  - IBM PL/I for OS/2, AIX, Linux, and z/OS
- PL/S (Programming Language/Systems), originally named BSL (Basic Systems Language), later PL/AS, PL/X
- POWER spooler for DOS/360 and successors (Program Output Writers and Execution Readers)
- REXX scripting language (REstructured eXtended eXecutor)
  - Object Rexx for OS/2, AIX, Linux, Windows and Solaris
- RPG (Report Program Generator)
  - RPG for IBM 1401 and System/360
  - RPG II for System/3, System/32, System/34, System/36, and System/370
  - RPG III for System/38, its successor AS/400, and System/370
  - RPG IV for RISC AS/400 and other machines running IBM i
- SOAP (Symbolic Optimal Assembly Program for IBM 650)
- Script A document markup language
  - SCRIPT component of CP/CMS
  - SCRIPT/370
  - SCRIPT/VS Component of Document Composition Facility (DCF)
  - SCRIPT/PC A subset of SCRIPT running under PC DOS
- SPS (Symbolic Programming System). An assembler (Note: 1401 SPS and 1620 SPS were incompatible) for IBM 1401 or IBM 1620 systems, less capable than Autocoder
- VFU (Vocabulary File Utility) for IBM 7772
- XEDIT an editor for VM/CMS systems

=== Middleware and applications ===
IBM distributes its diverse collection of software products over several brands; mainly:

1. IBM's own branding for many software products originally developed in-house;
2. Lotus: collaboration and communication;
3. Rational: software development and maintenance;
4. Tivoli: management, operations, and Cloud;
5. WebSphere: Internet.
6. Watson Main article: IBM Watson
7. Watsonx Main article: IBM Watsonx
- 9PAC Report generator for the IBM 7090 (709 PACkage)
- IBM Administrative Terminal System (ATS) Online Text Entry, Editing, Processing, Storage and Retrieval
- IBM Advanced Text Management System (ATMS) A CICS-based successor to ATS, ATMS served as the text entry system for STorage And Retrieval System (STAIRS)
- IBM Assistant Series (Filing Assistant, Reporting Assistant, Graphing Assistant, Writing Assistant and Planning Assistant)
- IBM Audio Distribution System
- IBM BS12 (IBM Business System 12)
- IBM CICS (Customer Information Control System)
- IBM CICS Transaction Gateway
- IBM CICS Web interpreter, IBM OD390
- IBM Cloudscape Pure Java Database Server. Now open source Apache Derby
- IBM Cognos Business Intelligence Business Intelligence Suite
- IBM Concurrent Copy, backup software
- IBM Content Manager OnDemand (CMOD)
- IBM Db2 Relational DBMS (DataBase 2)
- IBM DB2 Content Manager
- IBM DB2 Document Manager
- IBM DB2 Records Manager
- IBM Deep Computing Visualization for Linux V1.2
- IBM DISOSS Distributed Office Support System
- IBM Document Composition Facility (DCF); includes SCRIPT/VS
- IBM Document Library Facility (DLF)
- IBM BookMaster
- IBM BookManager
- IBM FileNet products, P8 Business Process Management and Enterprise Content Management (FileNet bought by IBM)
- IBM Graphical Data Display Manager (GDDM).
- IBM Generalized Information System (GIS).
- IBM HTTP Server
- IBM i2 Analyst's Notebook and COPLINK
- IBM Information Management System (IMS) Hierarchical database management system (DBMS)
- IBM Informix Dynamic Server
- IBM Lotus cc:Mail
- IBM Lotus Connections
- IBM Lotus Expeditor
- IBM Lotus QuickPlace
- IBM Lotus Quickr
- IBM Lotus Notes (Lotus Development was bought by IBM in 1995)
- IBM Lotus Sametime
- IBM Lotus SmartSuite Office Suite
- IBM Lotus Symphony Office Suite
- IBM Maximo Asset Management
- IBM Network Design and Analysis (NETDA)
- IBM Network Performance Monitor (NPM)
- IBM OfficeVision (originally named PROFS)
- IBM OMEGAMON
- IBM Personal Communications Emulator, also known as Host Access Client
- IBM Planning Analytics
- IBM Print Management Facility (PMF)
- IBM Print Services Facility (PSF)
- IBM QualityStage Acquired from Ascential
- Rational Software's products (Rational bought by IBM in 2003)
- IBM Rational Application Developer
- IBM Rational Software Architect
- IBM Rational System Architect
- IBM Rational Asset Manager
- IBM Rational Automation Framework Previously known as IBM Rational Automation Framework for WebSphere
- IBM Red Brick Database Server
- IBM RFID Information Center (RFIDIC) Tracking and tracing products through supply chains
- IBM Screen Definition Facility II (SDF II), a software tool for the interactive development of screen definition panels.
- IBM SearchManager text search, successor to STAIRS
- IBM Security Key Lifecycle Manager
- IBM Softek TDMF
- IBM STorage And Information Retrieval System (STAIRS) Text search
- IBM Sterling B2B Integrator
- IBM Teleprocessing Network Simulator (TPNS)
- IBM Tivoli Access Manager (TAM)
- IBM Tivoli Application Dependency Discovery Manager (TADDM)
- IBM Tivoli Asset Manager for IT (TAMIT)
- IBM Tivoli Framework (Tivoli Systems was bought by IBM in 1995)
- IBM Tivoli Change and Configuration Management Database (CCMDB)
- IBM Tivoli Compliance Insight Manager (TCIM)
- IBM Tivoli Monitoring
- IBM Tivoli Netview
- IBM Tivoli Netcool
- IBM Tivoli Provisioning Manager
- IBM Tivoli Service Automation Manager
- IBM Tivoli Storage Manager (Formerly ADSM, moved to Tivoli in 1999)
- IBM Tivoli Storage Manager FastBack
- IBM Tivoli Workload Scheduler
- IBM Tivoli System Automation
- IBM U2, including IBM UniVerse and IBM UniData Dimensional database DBMS
- IBM ViaVoice Dictation (early version: IBM VoiceType)
- IBM Virtualization Engine
- IBM VSPC
- IBM WebSphere
- IBM WebSphere Application Server (WAS)
- IBM WebSphere Adapters
- IBM Websphere Business Events
- IBM WebSphere Banking Transformation Toolkit
- IBM Websphere Host On-Demand (HOD) Host On-Demand Web-based TN3270, TN5250 and VT440 Terminal Emulation.
- IBM WebSphere Message Broker
- IBM MQ (previously known as IBM WebSphere MQ, and IBM MQSeries)
- IBM WebSphere Portal
- IBM WebSphere Portlet Factory
- IBM WebSphere Process Server
- WebSphere Service Registry and Repository
- IBM Worklight (Mobile application platform)
- IBM Workplace Web Content Management (IWWCM) Web content management for WebSphere Portal and Domino servers (Presence Online dba Aptrix bought by IBM in 2003)
- IBM Works Office suite for OS/2
- IBM Z Operational Log and Data Analytics
- IBM Z Anomaly Analytics with Watson
- IBM z/OS Workload Interaction Navigator
- TOURCast
- CoScripter
- ICCF Interactive Computing and Control Facility. An interactive editor that runs under CICS on DOS/VSE. Now included as part of "VSE Central Functions."
- NCCF Network Communications Control Facility. A network monitoring and control subsystem

==== Watson Customer Engagement ====
The Watson Customer Engagement (commonly known as WCE and formerly known as IBM Commerce) business unit supports marketing, commerce, and supply chain software development and product offerings for IBM. Software and solutions offered as part of these three portfolios by WCE are as follows:

===== Watson Marketing Portfolio =====
- Watson Campaign Automation
- IBM Tealeaf
- IBM Campaign
- Customer Experience Analytics
- Watson Marketing Insights
- IBM Journey Designer
- Watson Real-Time Personalization
- Watson Content Hub

===== Watson Commerce =====
- IBM Configure, Price, Quote
- IBM Digital Commerce
- IBM WebSphere Commerce
- Watson Commerce Insights
- IBM Order Management
- IBM Store Engagement
- Watson Order Optimizer
- IBM Call Center
- IBM Inventory Visibility
- IBM Watson Pay
- IBM Payment Gateway
- IBM Dynamic Pricing
- IBM Price Optimization
- IBM Price Management
- IBM Markdown Optimization
- Forms Experience Builder

===== Watson Supply Chain =====
- IBM Supply Chain Business Network
- IBM Connect:Direct
- IBM Supply Chain Insights
- IBM B2B Integration Portfolio
- IBM Strategic Supply Management

==== Watsonx ====
- watsonx.ai
- watsonx.data
- watsonx.governance

===== Models =====
- IBM Granite

== Data centers ==
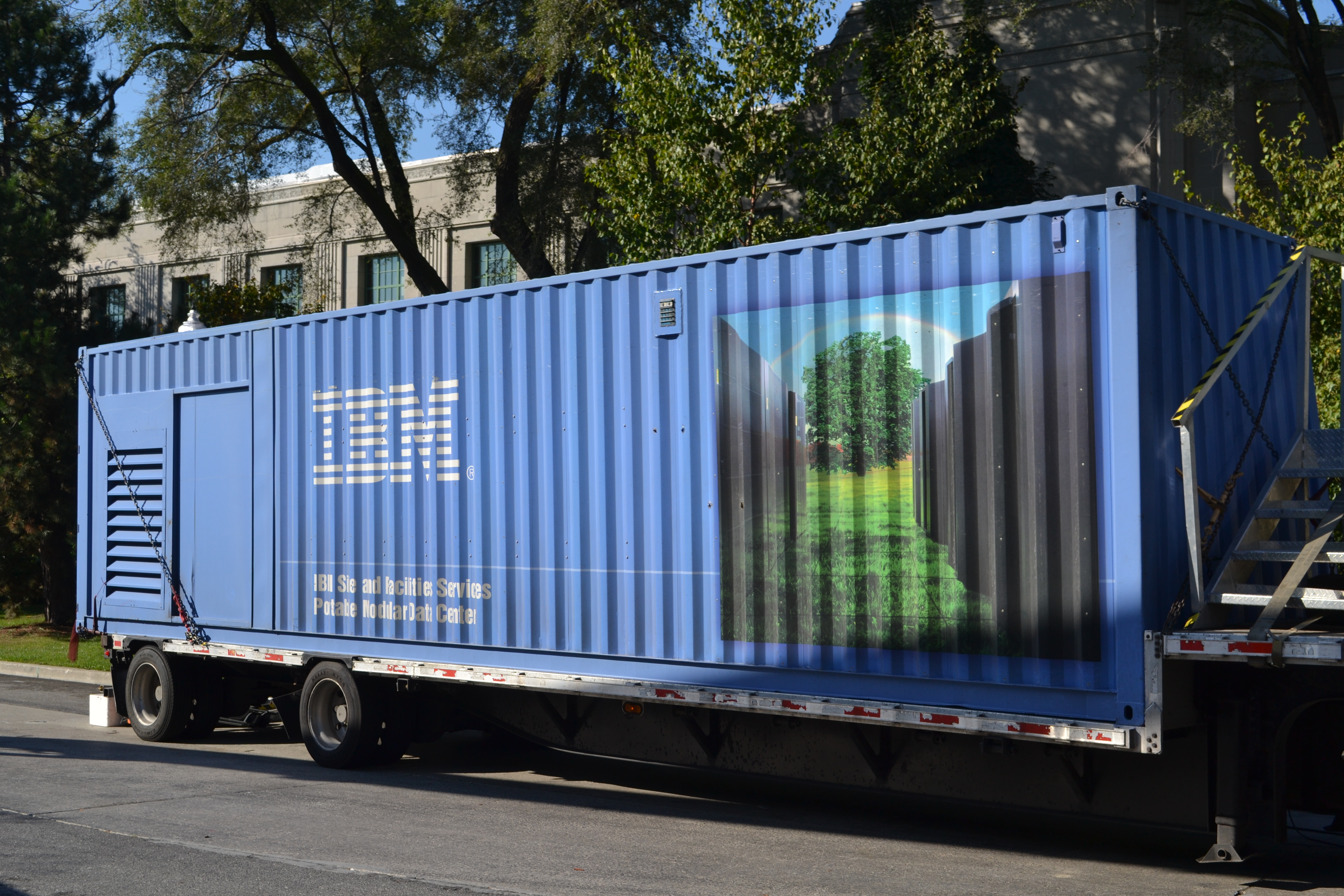
A 40-foot Portable Modular Data Center

- Portable Modular Data Center
- Scalable Modular Data Center

== Services ==
- CALL/360 timesharing service (1968)
- IBM's service bureau business: an in-house service, offered until 1957. See SBC, below.
- Silverpop, an Atlanta-based software company
- Service Bureau Corporation (SBC) was a subsidiary of IBM formed in 1957 to operate IBM's former service bureau business as an independent company. In 1973 sold to Control Data Corporation.

== See also ==
- IBM Product Center
- History of IBM magnetic disk drives
- History of hard disk drives
- OS/360 and successors
- Category:IBM products
