= IBM System/370 Model 148 =

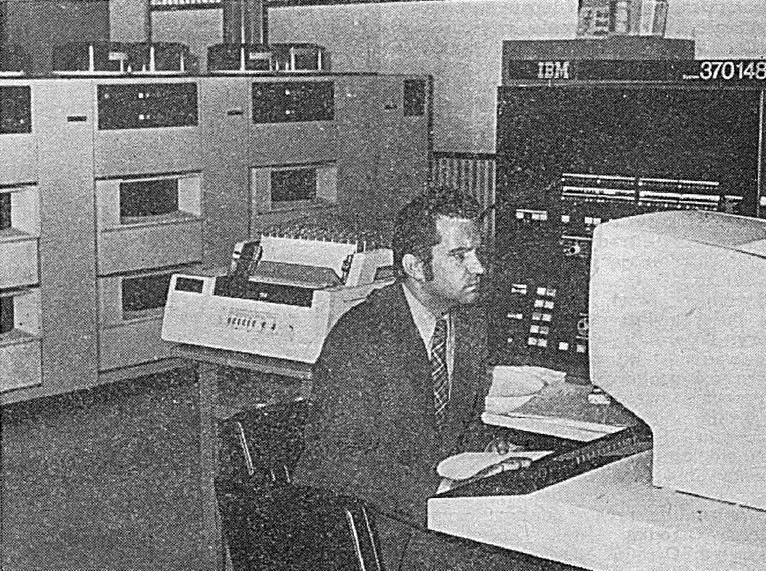
- IBM System/370 Model 148
- Manufacturer: International Business Machines Corporation (IBM)
- Product family: System/370
- Released: June 30, 1976
- Discontinued: November 1, 1983
- Memory: One or two megabytes of high-density integrated monolithic processor storage

The IBM System/370 Model 148 (and the Model 138) were both announced June 30, 1976

Not only were they both more powerful and better in price/performance than the IBM System/370 Model 145 with a 3145-3 CPU and the IBM System/370 Model 135 with a 3135-3 CPU, respectively, but lower in price.

The 148 and 138, both of which were withdrawn November 1, 1983, were marketed as followups for those wishing to upgrade, respectively, their 370/145 and 370/135 systems.

== Expanded capabilities ==
The 148 had four times the reloadable control storage of the 145, enabling or enhancing features such as:

- APL Assist
- Extended Control Program Support - going beyond the language-specific APL Assist, this had wider scope, reducing CPU cycles needed to run the operating system.

The 3148 (and the 3138) had a built in service processor, aka known as an IOC, this service processor could directly attach a 3203 printer. The IOC also drives an IBM 3277 display console, whereas the older 3145 used an IBM 3215 typewriter console.

A new model of the IBM 3203 printer family, the Model 4, was announced. Rated at 1200 lines/minute (LPM), it was intended to provide already-available 1200 LPM printing, but in a more compact form.

== Field upgrades ==
Sometimes known as in-the-field upgrades, this is a capability that even recently was not universal.

IBM could upgrade a 370/145 that had been field-upgraded to a 145-2, resulting in a 145-3. This was a major accomplishment, compared to what is known as a "forklift upgrade" out with the old, in with the new, often consuming valuable time.

== Marketing considerations ==
An industry research firm said "may be described as early 380s programmed to act like 370s"

== See also ==
- List of IBM products
- IBM System/360
- IBM System/370
