= IBM 416 =

The IBM 416 was a tabulating machine released in 1941 and produced in Milan.

== See also ==
- List of IBM products
