= IBM Shoebox =

1961 speech recognition computer

The IBM Shoebox was a 1961 IBM computer that was able to perform mathematical functions and provide speech recognition. It was capable of recognizing 16 spoken words, including the digits from 0 through 9.

It was developed by William C. Dersch in the Advanced Systems Development Division Laboratory at IBM

== History ==
It was displayed at the IBM Pavilion during the 1962 Seattle World's Fair.

It was approximately the size and shape of a standard American shoebox. It had a display of ten small lamp lights labeled with the digits 0 through 9 and an attached microphone. Speaking the name of the digit into the microphone would cause the appropriate digit lamp to light.

Inside the box were a power supply, three analog audio filters and some (presumably) Diode-Resistor-Logic circuitry. The design allowed for the recognition of each digit name “Zero”, “One”, Two” … “Nine” and its front, middle, and ending sound. (Sometimes no middle). And that each sound was high pitched, middle pitched or low pitched. Example: “Five” is High-Middle-High. “Zero” is High-Middle-Low. The microphone was connected to the three audio filters for high, middle, and low pass. The filters latched the logic based decoder and switched one of the ten lamps.

Early development in Natural Language Processing, like the IBM Shoebox, has influenced development in fields such as speech recognition, including things like "voice dialing", "call routing", and "automated appliance control".

== See also ==
- Speech recognition
- List of IBM products
