= IBM Kittyhawk =

Supercomputer

Kittyhawk is an IBM supercomputer. The proposed project entails constructing a global-scale shared supercomputer capable of hosting the entire Internet on one platform as an application, whereas the current Internet is a collection of interconnected computer networks.

In 2010 IBM open sourced the Linux kernel patches that allow otherwise unmodified Linux distributions to run on Blue Gene/P. This action allowed the Kittyhawk system software stack to be run at large scale at Argonne National Lab. The open source version of Kittyhawk is available on a public website hosted by Boston University.

In 2012 the Kittyhawk project was made a part of the United States Department of Energy fault oblivious execution (FOX) project, and ported to run on the Intrepid supercomputer at Argonne National Laboratory.

In 2013 researchers used the Kittyhawk project to demonstrate a novel high-performance cloud computing platform by merging a cloud computing environment with a supercomputer.

== Specifications ==
IBM Research has published three papers detailing the project. Kittyhawk will be based on the previously developed IBM supercomputer called Blue Gene/P. In theory, Kittyhawk can have up to 16,384 racks, for a total of 67.1 million cores and 32 PB (32 × 2^{50} bytes) of memory.

== See also ==
- List of IBM products
