= IBM 7302 =

Computer storage unit

The IBM 7302 Core Storage unit was designed in 1957–1958 for the IBM 7030 (Stretch). The IBM 7030 could use from one to sixteen IBM 7302s (typically six); either individually or in interleaved groups of two or four. The IBM 7090 also used one IBM 7302. The IBM 7094 used one IBM 7302A. The IBM 7094 II used one IBM 7302, but it was a new model unique to the IBM 7094 II. The IBM 7080 also used one decimal model IBM 7302 with a different core stack than used in the binary models.

The core memory in the IBM 7302 was heated/cooled to stabilize its operating characteristics. Early units immersed the core stack in heated/cooled oil. Later units, called the IBM 7302A, blew heated/cooled air through the core stack. The use of smaller cores in the IBM 7302A allowed the cycle time to be reduced to 2.0μs for the IBM 7094. The use of even smaller cores in the IBM 7302 Model 3 allowed the cycle time to be reduced to 1.4μs for the IBM 7094 II.

== Binary models ==
- 16,384 – 72-bit words w/ 2.18μs cycle time (IBM 7302A 2.0μs cycle time)
  - The IBM 7030 used this as 16,384 – 64-bit words and an 8-bit ECC. Interleaving of units could reduce effective cycle time to 1.09μs (two unit groups) or 0.545μs (four unit groups).
  - The IBM 7090 used this as 32,768 – 36-bit words.
  - The IBM 7094 used this as 32,768 – 36-bit words. Instructions were fetched in 72-bit word pairs, reducing effective instruction fetch time to 1.0μs.
- 8,192 – 72-bit words w/ 2.18μs cycle time
  - The IBM 7030 used this as 8,192 – 64-bit words and an 8-bit ECC. Interleaving of units could reduce effective cycle time to 1.09μs (two unit groups) or 0.545μs (four unit groups).
- 32,768 – 36-bit words w/ 1.4μs cycle time and Even/Odd word overlapped access.
  - The IBM 7094 II used this as 32,768 – 36-bit words. Because the Even 36-bit word and Odd 36-bit word were independent in this model their accesses could overlap, which could reduce effective cycle time to 0.7μs.

== Decimal models ==
- 160,000 – 7-bit characters w/ 2.18μs cycle time
  - The IBM 7080 used this as 160,000 – 7-bit characters; CBA8421.
- 80,000 – 7-bit characters w/ 2.18μs cycle time
  - The IBM 7080 used this as 80,000 – 7-bit characters; CBA8421.
