= IBM Z System Automation =

- Developer: IBM
- Stable release: 4.4.0
- Written in: REXX and Assembler
- Operating system: z/OS
- Platform: IBM Mainframe
- Available in: English and other languages
- License: Proprietary
- Website: www.ibm.com/docs/en/z-system-automation

IBM Z System Automation (SA z/OS) is a policy-based automation solution to ensure the availability of applications and system resources. It runs within IBM Z NetView, and uses its capabilities to interact with z/OS.

== Functionality ==
The primary objective of this software is to keep Resources on the z/OS systems in a desired (or goal) state of Available or Unavailable. Each resource can be individually controlled via commands to set the goal state by means of Requests (or Votes). This goal state is stored, so should a resource fail or the system be shut down, it can be brought back to its previous Desired state quickly and easily. A Resource is any Application or System Resource which can be monitored and controlled. Resources have relationships defined between them, which ensures they are started and stopped in the correct order.

The resources are defined in a policy database (PDB), which enables all the definitions for an entire enterprise to be defined just once. A Build process is used to extract the relevant resources for each systems into Automation Control Files (ACF). As a minimum, a resource definition contains: jobname, start commands, stop commands, status messages, relationships.

SA z/OS is IBM Parallel Sysplex compliant, and can manage your business applications whether they run within a monoplex, between multiple sysplexes, or in distributed Linux, UNIX or Windows platforms. The Service Management Unite Automation dashboard provides a single point of control to monitor and operate in your environment.

SA z/OS is required for Geographically Dispersed Parallel Sysplex (GDPS).

== Supported Operating Systems ==
The software is available on following operating systems:

- z/OS
