= IBM LPFK =

Computer input device

The Lighted Program Function Keyboard (LPFK) is a computer input device manufactured by IBM that presents an array of buttons associated with lights. Each button is associated to a function in supporting software, and according to the availability of that function in current context of the application, the light is switched on or off, giving the user a graphical feedback on the set of available functions. Usually the button to function mapping is customizable.
