= IBM 3196 =

The IBM 3196 Display Station is a 24x80 monochrome display and keyboard made by IBM. It can be used with the System/36, System/38, or AS/400 through wired attachment or Telnet. It uses a typewriter keyboard to enter, display, and manipulate data on a 12-inch monochrome screen. The 3196 performs all the basic functions of the 5291-2, as well as some additional functions. The 3196 also has a 25th character line containing an operator information area. The 3196 is compatible with the 5291 Model 2 Display Station and applications written for that product will operate on the 3196.

== Features ==
- 24x80 monochrome display
- Offers functions equivalent to the 5291 model 2
- Comes with Cable-Thru with Auto-Termination and Screen Glare Reduction
- Consists of three workstation elements: video, logic, and keyboard
- Offers field editing of individual data-input fields
- Allows variety of cable attachments and connections
- Provides Security Keylock and other security facilities

== Elements ==
The IBM 3196 contains the following elements:

- Display
- Display stand
- 122-key keyboard
- Keyboard overlay
- Logic element
- Auto-termination unit
- Security keys
- Video cable
- Power cord
- User guide
