= IBM 2790 =

The IBM 2790 Data Communications System is a family of devices intended for "in-plant data communications and production monitoring." It is described as a two-way data communications system designed to accommodate large volumes of short messages from many in-plant locations or from smaller groups of terminals at remote locations.

The 2790 consists of one IBM 2715 Transmission Control Unit, or an IBM 1800 Data Acquisition and Control System, which controls the other system components. The 2715 supports up to 32 KB of magnetic core memory with a 1.2 μs cycle time, an internal disk for microcode load, a 2740 printer/keyboard, and a real time clock. The 2715 provides terminal control, transaction assembly, data-entry checking, message routing, transaction storage, and transfer of data to and from a IBM System/370, IBM 1800, or an IBM System/7.

- 2715 Model 1: Used for local operation
- 2715 Model 2: Used for remote attachment with a binary synchronous communication adapter such as a 270x communications controller.

The 2715 supports a mix of other devices, all connected by a two-wire loop operating at 500 kbit/s. There are numerous data entry devices that can be attached:

- The IBM 2791 Area Station is a tabletop unit attached to the 2790 loop. The 2791 can read ten column identification badges and eighty column punched cards, and has a twelve key pad for direct entry of numeric data. The 2791 can attach up to thirty-two 2795/2796 data entry units, a 1053 printer, up to three 1035 remote badge readers, and an OEM device. The 2791 has nine user defined "transaction buttons". Up to 100 2791/2793 can be attached.
- The IBM 2793 Area Station is similar, but lacks the ability to accept input data directly. It can attach up to thirty-two data entry units and a 1053 printer. Up to 100 2791/2793 can be attached.
- The IBM 2795, 2796 and 2797 Data Entry Units are compact industrial units for reporting job and machine status and production information. Both have two ten-position switches and a ten column badge reader. The 2796 has an additional two switches and allows for manual entry of up to four digits.
- 2740 Communications Terminal (one)
- 2798 Guided Display Units. This is a versatile and compact data entry and output unit with a 56 character keyboard, 8 control keys and 16 position visual display. Up to 12 can be attached.
