= IBM 738 =

The IBM 738 was IBM's first core memory unit to use transistorized sense amplifier circuits. Designed in 1955 for the IBM 704, it used vacuum tubes for all other circuits, and provided a capacity of 32768 - 36-bit words. It was also used in the later IBM 709.
