= IBM TouchMobile =

Hand-held computer

The IBM TouchMobile is a robust and practical hand-held computer announced by IBM in 1993. This device has a bar code scanner with on-screen signature and data capture. Certain models are capable of Wireless communication.

The hand-held computer used a version of embedded DOS. The processor was an 80C88 processor. The system design also used 1.5 MB of PSRAM (Pseudostatic DRAM) and two custom chips.
