= IBM 3584 =

The IBM Tape Library 3584 also known as TS3500/TS4500 Tape Library. The number of tape drives it contains, is dependent on the frame's sub-model.
