= IBM 357 =

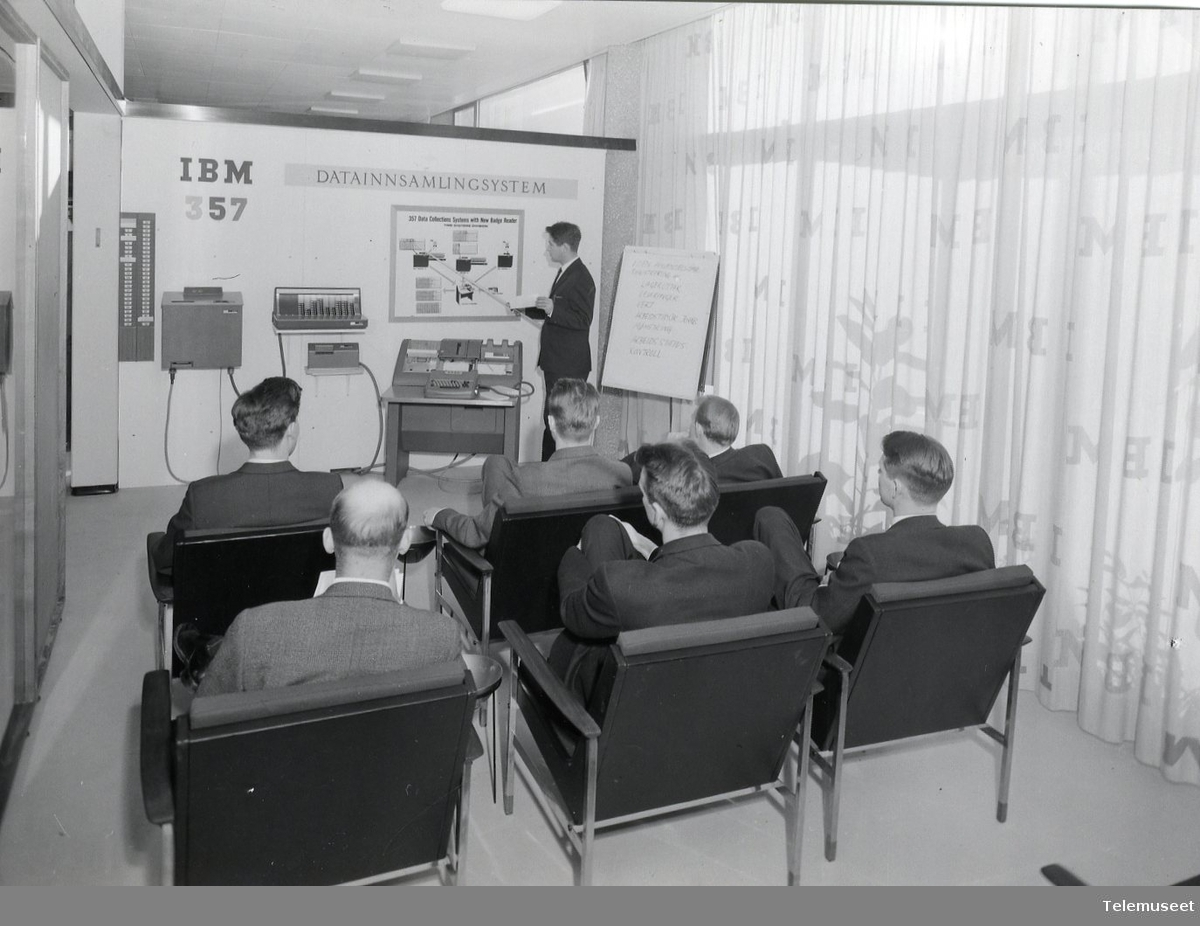
Lecture about IBM 357 system architecture; the most massive component is a IBM 024 Card Punch.

IBM 357 Data Collection System is a now obsolete punched card-based terminal system for sending and receiving remote data.

It consisted of:

- IBM 357 Input Station (Badge and/or serial card reader)
- IBM 358 Input Control Unit
- IBM 360 Clock Read-Out Control
- IBM 361 Read-Out Clock
- IBM 372 Manual Entry
- IBM 373 Punch Switch
- IBM 374 Cartridge Reader
- IBM 013 Badge Punch
- IBM 024/026 Card Punch (81 col)

== History ==
The IBM 357 system was announced worldwide in 1959. It began to be installed the following year, at libraries, manufacturing plants, etc.

The IBM 1030 Data Collection System and IBM 1050 Data Communications System were typically used in an office environment; the IBM 357 system carried out similar functions in manufacturing plants, for example steel mills.

Many of the devices are described and pictured in 1961 IBM Data Collection in the Factory manual.
