= GPSS (disambiguation) =

GPSS is the General Purpose Simulation System, a programming language.

GPSS may also refer to:

- Exolum Pipeline System, formerly the Government Pipelines and Storage System, UK pipeline system
- Guam Public School System, school district
- GPS Software, GPS navigation software
