= Jeffrey Gordon =

Jeffrey or Geoffrey Gordon may refer to:

- Jeffrey I. Gordon (c. 1947), American biologist
- J. D. Gordon (born 1967), former U.S. Navy public affairs officer, Herman Cain presidential campaign staffer
- Jeff Gordon (Jeffery, born 1971), American race car driver
- Geoffrey Gordon (composer) (born 1968), recipient of the Aaron Copland Award 2008-09
- Geoffrey Gordon (composer) (1952–2012), worked on Best Laid Plans album
- Geoffrey Gordon (computer scientist), creator of the popular GPSS simulation system language
- Geoffrey J. Gordon, computer scientist, director of Microsoft Montreal research lab, professor at Carnegie Mellon
- Jeff Gordon (politician), member of the Connecticut Senate

== See also ==
- Jeff Gordon, Secret Agent, a 1963 French-Italian comedy crime film
- Gordon Jeffery (born 1936), Australian canoeist
