= IBM 1800 Data Acquisition and Control System =

Process control variant of the IBM 1130 minicomputer

IBM 1800

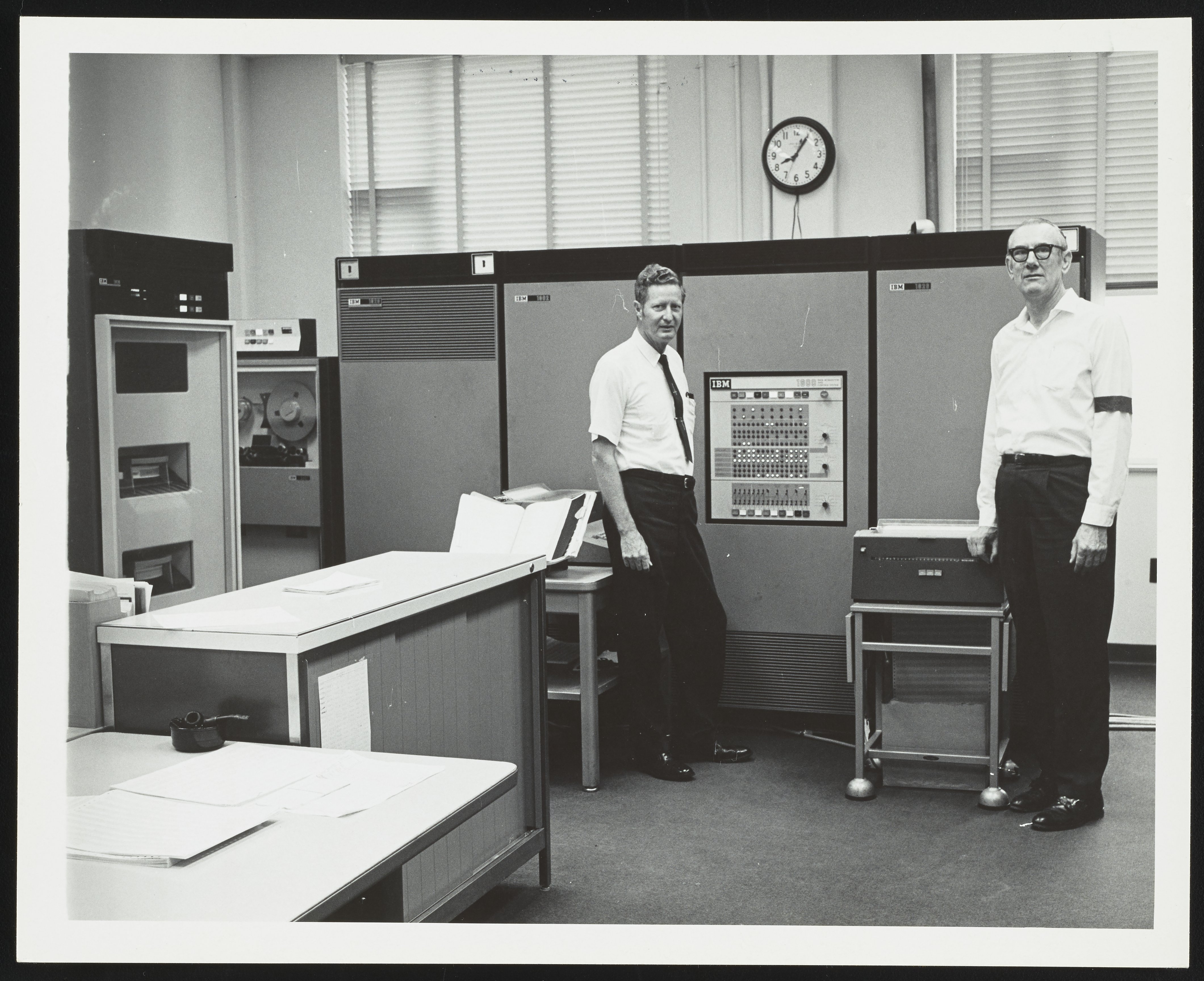
- IBM 1800 computer at Exxon Research and Engineering Company laboratory
- Manufacturer: IBM
- Type: real-time minicomputer (SCADA system)
- Released: 1964
- Predecessor: IBM 1130, IBM 1710, IBM 7700
- Related: IBM 1500 educational minicomputer

The IBM 1800 Data Acquisition and Control System (DACS) was a process control variant of the IBM 1130 with two extra instructions (CMP and DCM), extra I/O capabilities, 'selector channel like' cycle-stealing capability and three hardware index registers.

IBM announced and introduced the 1800 Data Acquisition and Control System on November 30, 1964, describing it as "a computer that can monitor an assembly line, control a steel-making process or analyze the precise status of a missile during test firing."

== Overview ==
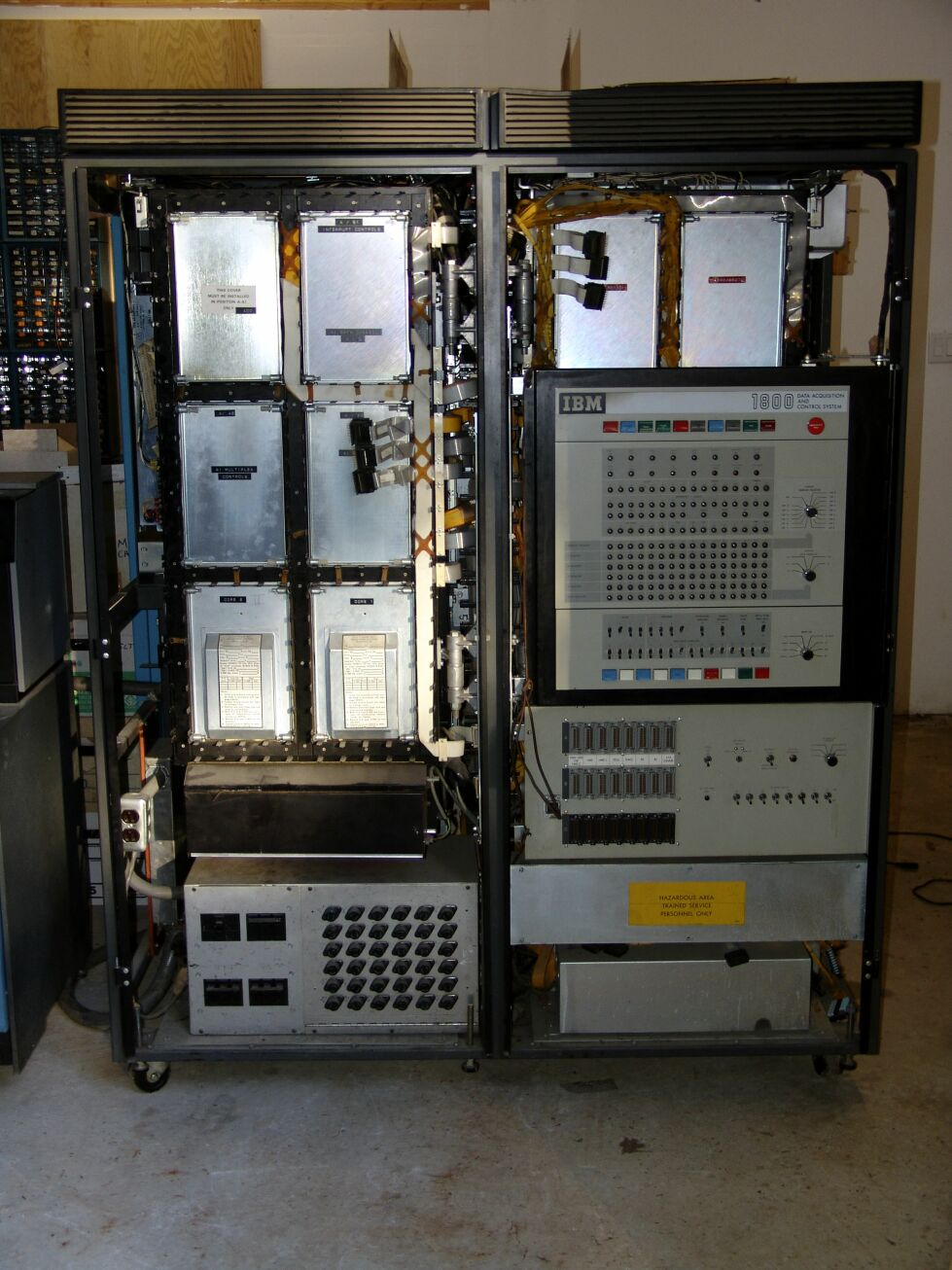
IBM 1800 mainframe.

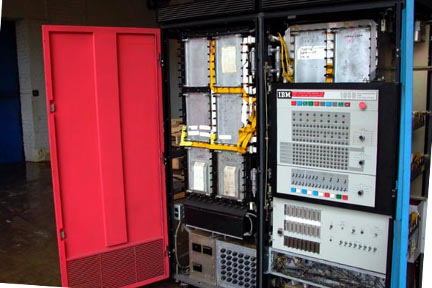
IBM 1800 with its covers open

Unlike the 1130, which was a desk-like unit, the 1800 is packaged in 6 foot high, EIA Standard 19 inch racks, which are somewhat taller than the racks used by S/360 systems of the same vintage, but the internal gates and power supplies were very much the same.

The IBM 1500 instructional system was introduced by IBM on March 31, 1966, and was based on an IBM 1130 or IBM 1800 computer. It supported up to 32 student work stations, each with a variety of audiovisual capabilities.

Two 1800s with automatic switchover between them powered each IBM 1750, 2750 and 3750 Switching System.

== Components ==
The IBM 1800 DACS consisted of:

- D/A (Digital-to-Analog) Converter
- A/D (Analog-to-Digital) Converter
- IBM 1801 Processor Controller, with operator's panel
- IBM 1802 Processor Controller, with operator's panel, to include adapters for 2401/2402 Magnetic Tape Units.
- IBM 1803 Core Storage Addition
- IBM 1826 I/O Expansion Chassis (used for communications I/O, System/360 channels, 279x)
- IBM 1828 Process Expansion Unit (used for additional D/A or A/D converters, or to hold 1851 and/or 1854 multiplexors; there was an RPQ for a remote 1828 unit)
- IBM 1810 Disk (equivalent to 2310 on IBM 1130)
- IBM 1816 Printer Keyboard (System Printer)
- IBM 1851 Reed Relay Analog Multiplexor
- IBM 1854 Solid State Analog Multiplexor
- IBM 1894 generic model number for many 1800 RPQ hardware features, which inter alia, included support for IBM 109x data entry devices)
- IBM 1053 Printer
- IBM 1054 Paper Tape Reader Unit
- IBM 1055 Paper Tape Punch Unit
- IBM 1442 Card Reader/Punch Unit
- IBM 1443 Printer
- IBM 1627 Plotter
- IBM 2401 or 2402 Magnetic Tape Unit (its adapter included in IBM 1802)
- IBM 2311 DASD (attached via an IBM 2841 Control Unit, latter attached to a channel in the IBM 1826), the MPX operating system could map two 1810 disks per 2311, the 1810 drive mapping being seen as a Format 5 DSCB to S/360 OS)
- IBM 2260 CRT (attached via an IBM 2848 Control Unit, latter attached to a channel in the IBM 1826)
- IBM 2790 Data Communication System, one of the earliest Token Ring type local area networks were attached and controlled by the IBM 1800.

== Use ==
The IBM 1800 systems were used mainly in the process industry plants worldwide.

In June 2010, the last four IBM 1800s operating at Pickering Nuclear Generating Station in Pickering, Ontario, Canada were removed from service. Pickering is still using four ES-1800 computers which are IBM 1800 hardware emulators built by Cable & Computer Technologies. A video showing the end of the Pickering IBM 1800 boot sequence is available on YouTube

Until 1984, Exxon USA (EUSA) had 18 IBM 1800 systems deployed at all 5 of its refineries. They were replaced with Honeywell TDC3000 process control systems.

Preceded by IBM 7700 Data Acquisition System	IBM 1800 Data Acquisition and Control System; 1964 - 1972	Succeeded by n/a
Preceded by IBM 1710 Control System	IBM 1800 Data Acquisition and Control System; 1964 - 1972	Succeeded by IBM System/7 control system
