= IBM 1500 =

1966 IBM computer system for use in education

- Type: educational minicomputer
- Released: 1966; 60 years ago
- Predecessor: IBM 1130, IBM 1800
- Related: IBM 1400

The IBM 1500 instructional system was introduced by IBM on March 31, 1966, and its primary purpose was to implement Computer Assisted Instruction (CAI). Based around either an IBM 1130 or an IBM 1800 computer, it supported up to 32 student work stations, each with a variety of audiovisual capabilities.

Seeded by a research grant in 1964 from the U.S. Department of Education to the Institute for Mathematical Studies in the Social Sciences at Stanford University, the IBM 1500 CAI system was initially prototyped at the Brentwood Elementary School (Ravenswood City School District) in East Palo Alto, California by Dr. Patrick Suppes of Stanford University. The students first used the system in 1966.

The first production IBM 1500 system was shipped to Stanford University in August 1967.

Preliminary versions of course materials that educators could use with the IBM 1500 were developed by Science Research Associates, Inc., an IBM subsidiary.

Most educational programming on the IBM 1500 system was done in the specialized computer programming language called Coursewriter.

The IBM 1500 system and its learning environment was a modern step in the history of virtual learning environments.

== Overview ==
Buck and Hunka wrote in their 1995 retrospective and historical paper that:

"The IBM 1500 Instructional System was the only commercial system produced by a single manufacturer that had an integrated student terminal configuration providing a keyboard and light pen response mode, CRT-based graphics, audio, and static film projection. Experimental instructional systems had been developed by IBM prior to a prototype version of the 1500 Instructional System, which was tested at Stanford University. A production version of the 1500 System with changes in the CPU and the audio system and having the capability to run a maximum of 32 student stations was installed in over 30 sites beginning in the late 1960s. IBM's commitment to the development of this system was extensive but short-lived, as most sites were unable to maintain funding support for the system. In retrospect, the IBM 1500 System had capabilities yet to be supported on the microcomputer systems of the 1990s."

== Selected educational applications ==
The Computer Assisted Instruction (CAI) Division of the U.S. Army Signal Center and School (USASCS) at Fort Monmouth, New Jersey evaluated CAI's success in teaching basic electronics by using material presented in the tutorial mode on the IBM 1500 System, utilizing the IBM Coursewriter language, an IBM 1510 Display Console, and an IBM 1512 Image Projector.
