= IBM 7700 Data Acquisition System =

Computer by IBM

7700 Data Acquisition System

- IBM 7700 Data Acquisition System
- Manufacturer: IBM
- Released: 1963
- Successor: IBM 1800
- Related: IBM 1710

The IBM 7700 Data Acquisition System was announced by IBM on December 2, 1963.

It is capable of collecting data from as many as 32 sources simultaneously, process the data and transmit results to up to 16 remote printers, display units or plot boards.

The IBM 7700 was short-lived, being replaced by the IBM 1800 Data Acquisition and Control System on November 30, 1964.

Two IBM 7700 Data Acquisition Systems are known to have existed: one at the University of Rochester and the other at Stanford University. Both were donated by IBM.

The IBM 7700 is an 18-bit system, with instructions occupying two 18-bit words. Arithmetic instructions generally execute in two or three machine cycles, except for multiply, about 8 cycles, and divide, 12 cycles. A machine cycle is two microseconds. Address space is 262,144 words, but the two machines known to have been built had 16,384, 32,768 or 49,152 words.

The IBM 7700 is contemporary with the IBM 7000 series but not considered a member of it.
