= IBM 1627 =

1960s era plotter made by Calcomp

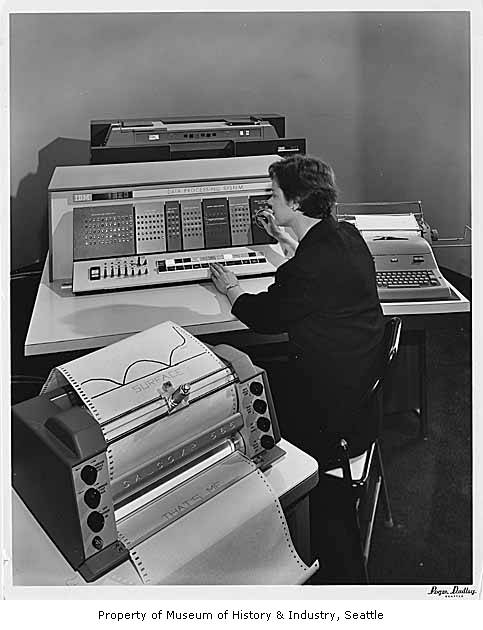
IBM 1620 data processing machine with IBM 1627 plotter, on display at the Seattle World's Fair, 1962

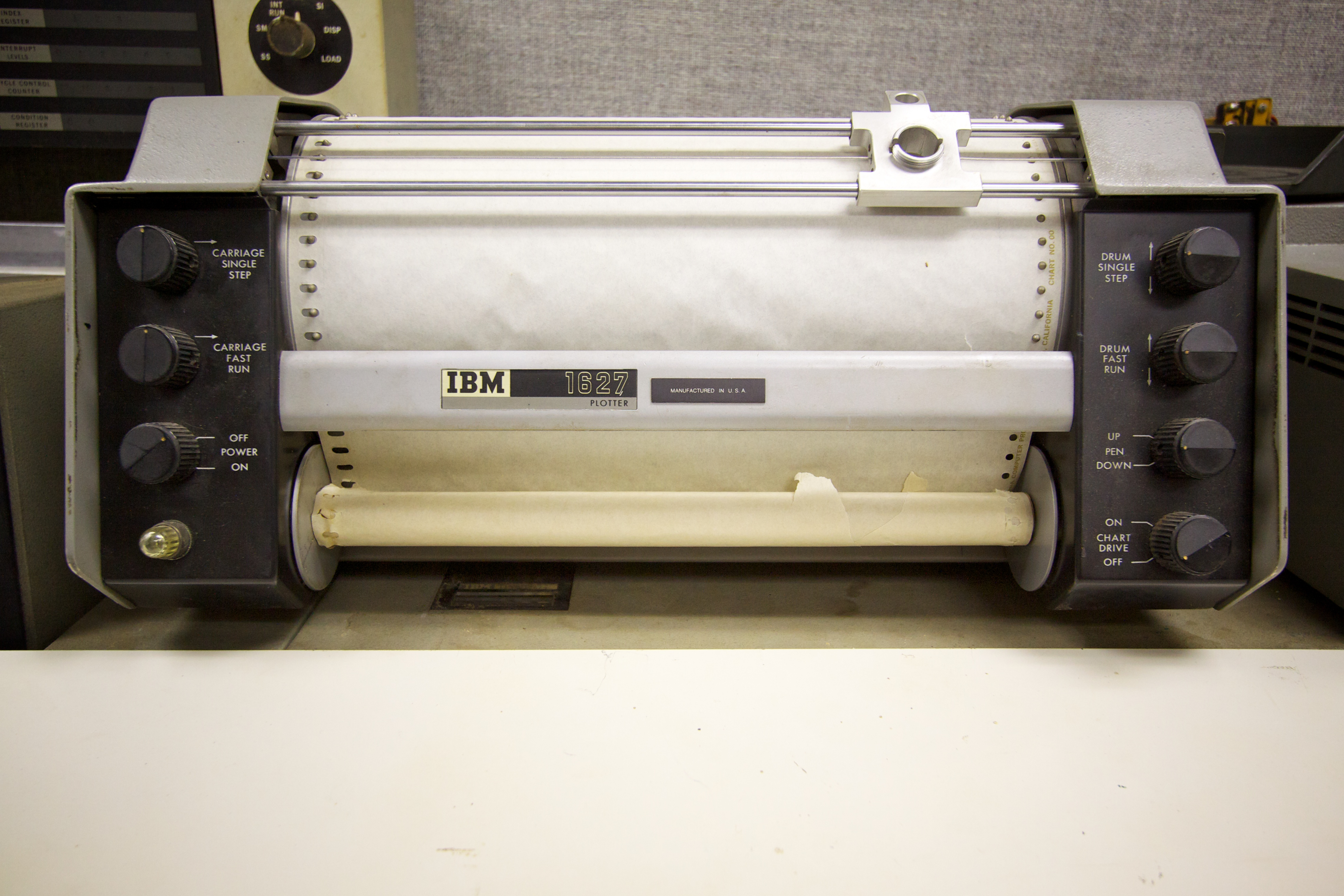
IBM 1627 drum plotter. Note pen assembly is missing.

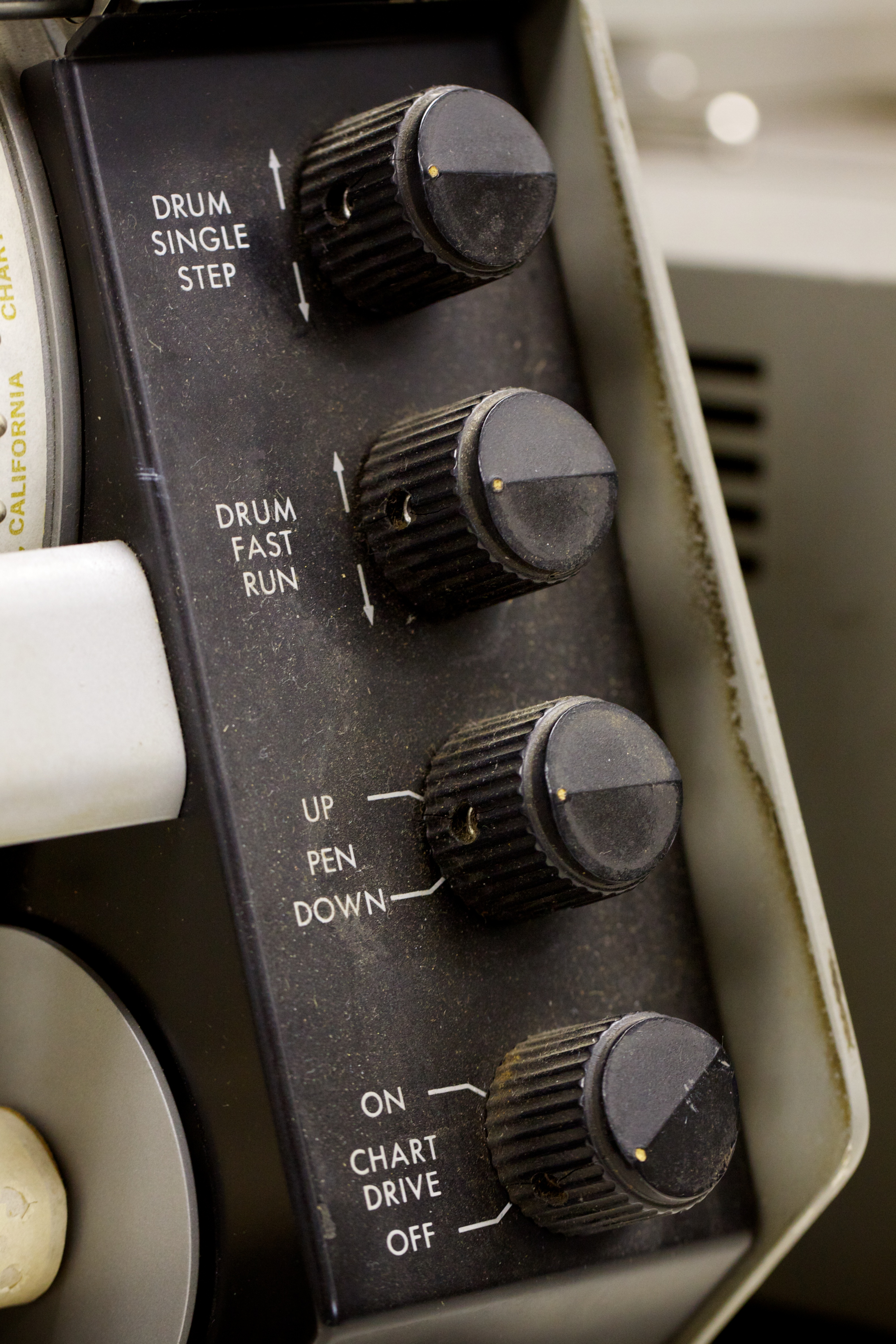
Closeup of IBM 1627 drum plotter right side, showing controls for manually moving the drum.

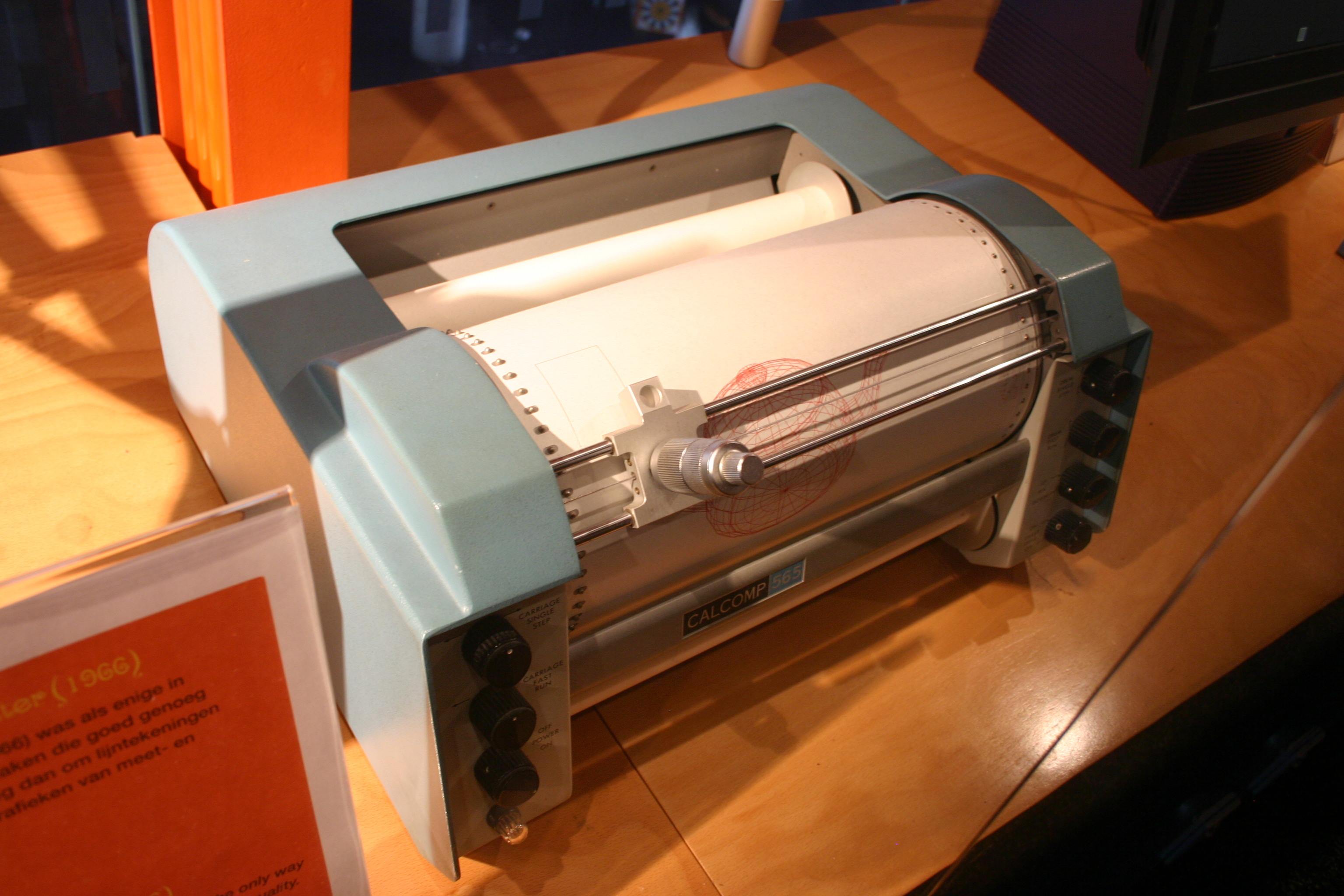
A Calcomp 565 drum plotter, essentially the same as the 1627, with pen assembly.

The IBM 1627 was a rebranded Calcomp plotter sold by IBM for use with the IBM 1620, and, later, the IBM 1130 computers. It became perhaps the first non-IBM peripheral that IBM allowed to be attached to one of its computers.

The plotter fed a roll of paper with perforated edges over a drum with matching sprockets at the sides. The drum could move the paper forward and backward (the X-axis). A pen holder slid horizontally over the paper (the Y-axis). Both the drum and the pen holder were controlled by stepper motors. Commands included lowering the pen down to write and raising it up, and moving the drum or the pen holder one step of 1/100 inch (0.25 mm) in either direction. There were also commands to move the drum and pen together one step in the four diagonal directions.

The standard size 1627 Model 1 was a Calcomp model 565 plotter and used 12-inch-wide paper (305 mm) with a plotting area of 11 inches (280 mm). Model 1 could operate at 18,000 steps per minute. Model 2 was a Calcomp 563 and used 31-inch-wide paper (787 mm) with a plotting area of 29 1/2 inches (750 mm). Model 2 could operate at 12,000 steps per minute.

The paper rolls were 120 feet (37 m) long. A metal bar above the take-up reel allowed a finished plot to be torn off and removed. The drum would then be advanced using the manual controls and the fresh paper end taped to the take-up reel. The standard pen was a ball-point, but liquid ink pens were available, and typically used for higher quality plots intended for publication. Other paper stock could be taped to the drum if desired. A chart drive switch was provided to turn off the motorized paper supply and take-up reels for this purpose.
