= Geoffrey Gordon (computer scientist) =

Computer scientist

- Born: May 17, 1924; England
- Died: December 19, 1989 (aged 65); Washington, New Jersey
- Known for: GPSS

Geoffrey Gordon was the creator of the popular GPSS simulation system language.

== Career ==
In the early 1950s, Gordon began using analog computers for simulation in England. A few years later he began working with digital computers.

He moved to the United States in 1955 where he continued working with digital simulation at Westinghouse Electric Corporation. At the end of following year (1956) he began working at Bell Labs, writing simulation software for message switching systems.

In 1959, he started work on a project to digitally simulate what was seen across flow-chart style simulation sequence diagrams, instead of writing new software for each one. These diagrams used nodes to communicate the flow and operations of a simulation. The project, called the "Sequence Diagram Simulator" was completed at the end of that year.

In 1960, Gordon became manager of the Advanced Systems Development Division at IBM which experimented with new technology to design more efficient systems, especially in teleprocessing problems. Since the use of simulation was important in creating accurate models, Gordon suggested that a block diagram language be created similar to the Sequence Diagram Simulator. The new program and corresponding language, unofficially called the "Gordon Simulator", was developed in the IBM 704 symbolic assembly language. It became known throughout the company as a useful tool and became officially documented for internal use in the company on October 25, 1960. The use of the program outside of the company was soon recognized by the Cross Industry Marketing Group of IBM. On October 6, 1961, the program became available publicly outside of IBM as "GPSS I" after a complete rewrite. It was initially available for the IBM 704, 709, and 7090.

Gordon retired from IBM as a Consulting Systems Engineer and an IBM Fellow. He then became a professor at Kean University.

On December 19, 1989, he died in Washington, New Jersey.
