= IBM System/370 Model 115 =

- Manufacturer: International Business Machines Corporation (IBM)
- Product family: System/370
- Released: March 13, 1973
- Discontinued: March 19, 1981

The IBM System/370 Model 115 was announced March 13, 1973, at that time the low-end model of the System/370 line. It was promoted as "an ideal System/370 entry system for users of IBM's System/3, 1130 computing system and System/360 Models 20, 22 and 25."

The Model 115 was withdrawn on March 9, 1981.

== Specifications ==
The CPU had a CPU and memory cycle time of 480 ns. Main memory was composed of MOSFET monolithic integrated circuits. The Model 115 came standard with 65,536 (64 KB) of memory, but it could optionally be ordered with up to 196,608 (192 KB). The system had a CRT operator console.

Standard features of the Model 115 were the System/370 standard and commercial (including decimal arithmetic) instruction sets, and a "direct disk attachment" for IBM 3340 disk drives. Optional features included System/370 floating point instructions, System/360 Model 20 compatibility, IBM 1401, 1440 and 1460 compatibility, and various input/output attachment options (see below).

== Input/output ==
The Model 115 used integrated attachments to connect to I/O devices. The standard direct disk attachment could attach two to four IBM 3340 disk drives for a total of up to 280 million bytes. Optional integrated attachments provided a standard multiplexer channel interface for slow-speed devices, or, alternatively, an "integrated card I/O attachment" for attachment of either an IBM 5425 Multifunction Card Unit or an IBM 2560 Multifunction Card Machine. An "Integrated Printer Attachment" allowed attachment of either an IBM 3203 or an IBM 5203 line printer. A "magnetic tape adapter" supported an IBM 3210/3211 controller and tape drives. An "Integrated Communications Adapter" could attach up to "four synchronous and eight asynchronous communications lines, or as many as five synchronous communications lines"

== Software ==
The operating system for the Model 115 was either DOS/360 or DOS/VS. DOS/VS supported a single address space of 16,777,216 (16 MB) of virtual storage. This address space could be divided up into up to five partitions. The system could run all software written for System/370 (as long as memory and device requirements were met) Language processors included Assembler, APL, RPG II, COBOL, FORTRAN and PL/I.
