= IBM System/360 Model 25 =

Low-end IBM computer model from late-1960s

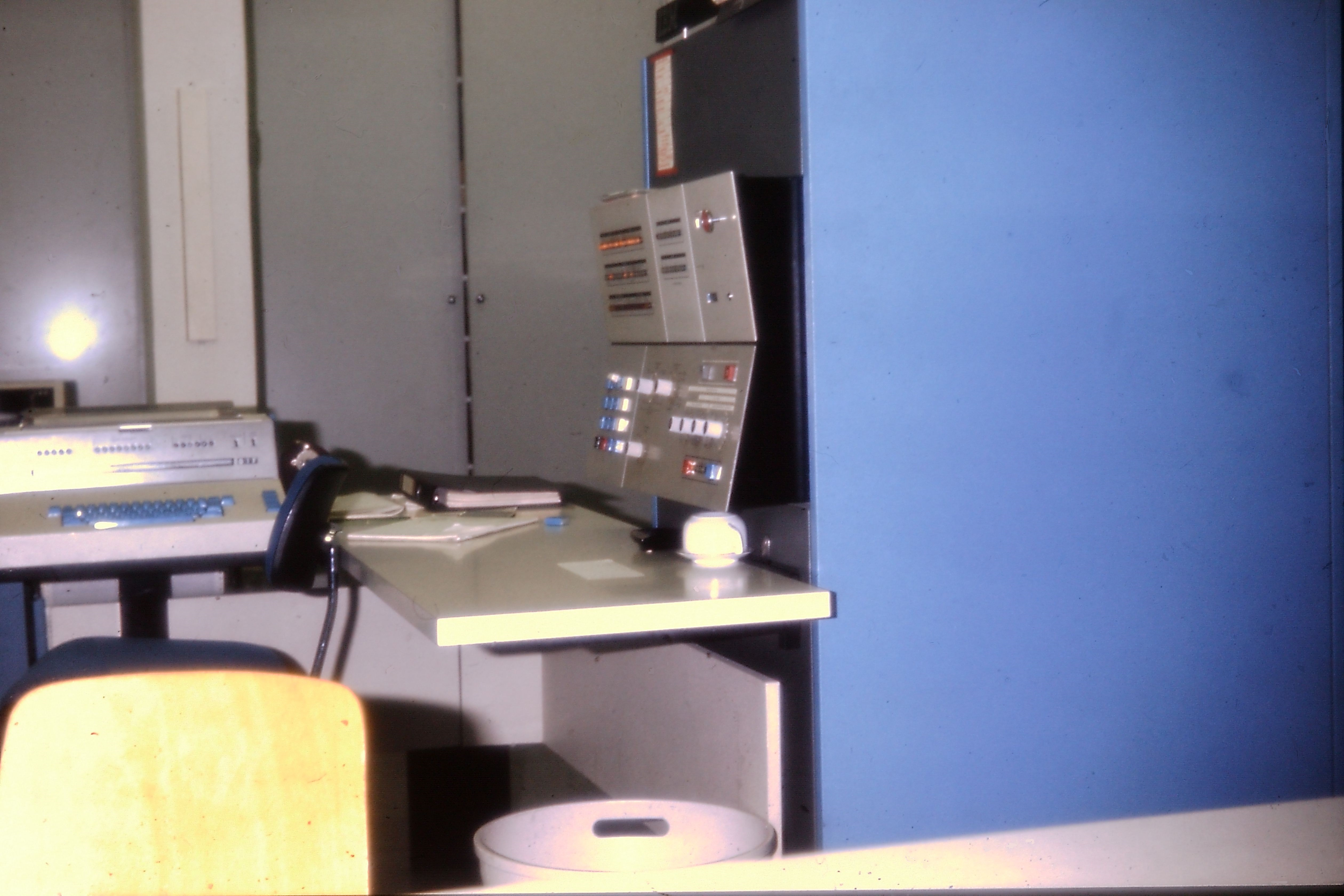
- IBM System/360 Model 25
- Manufacturer: International Business Machines Corporation (IBM)
- Product family: System/360
- Released: January 4, 1968
- Introductory price: $253,000 ($5,330/month) (typical configuration), including at least twice the memory of the 360/30
- Discontinued: October 7, 1977
- Memory: 16 - 48K Core
- Website: Official website IBM Archives

The IBM System/360 Model 25 is a low-end member of the IBM System/360 family. It was announced on January 3, 1968, 3 years before the IBM System/360 Model 22, as a "bridge between its old and new computing systems".

== History ==
At a time when lower priced alternatives, such as service bureaus - by 1968, there were 32 such service bureaus serving the US National Institutes of Health (NIH) alone - and prior generation systems, such as the Honeywell 200, a competitor to IBM's own IBM 1401, were available, this model provided a stop-gap measure.

Both the Model 25 and the Model 22, which had been marketed as entry level systems, were withdrawn on the same day, October 7, 1977.

== Models ==
The Model 25 can be configured with 16K, 24K, 32K, or 48K of core memory.

== Characteristics ==
The base Model 25 implements the System/360 standard and commercial instruction sets. The scientific or universal instruction sets are optional features.

The Model 25 logic is built on IBM SLT modules mounted on pluggable cards, which are plugged into printed circuit boards. The boards are mounted on hinged metal gates, and are interconnected by flat cables.

The Model 25 is the first IBM system to store its microcode in a rewritable memory, called the control storage. The control storage uses an additional 16 K (16,384) bytes of core memory. There is also a small part of the core storage that is used to store the contents of registers accessible by software, as well as data used by the microcode.

The Model 25 also has a 64-byte high-speed (180 ns) SLT Local Storage, used by the microcode.

=== Standard Features ===
- Commercial instruction set
- Attachment for 1052 Printer-Keyboard Model 7

=== Optional Features ===
- Scientific or universal instruction set
- Byte multiplexer channel or selector channel (one of either)
- Storage protection
- Direct control (with external interrupt) or external interrupt (alone)
- Timer (line-frequency type)
- IBM 1401/1460 compatibility
- 1401/1440/1460 DOS compatibility
- 1440 compatibility
- System/360 Model 20 mode
- CPU-integrated attachments for:

One 1403 Prnter Model 2 or 7. After the original announcement the IBM 1403 model N1 was added.
As many as four 2311 Disk Storage Drives Model 1 (with file scan feature)
One 2540 Card Read Punch Model 1 (with column binary feature and punch feed read control)
One 2560 Multi-function Card Machine Model A1 (for Model 20 mode; also for System/360 mode [read/punch only] if the 2540 emulation feature is added
CPU-integrated communications attachment
One 2314 High Speed Channel - this feature is an RPQ, and was not part of the original announcement

=== Integrated Attachments ===
The Model 25 has a standard attachment for connection of a 1052 Model 7 console printer-keyboard, which is used as the operator console. Optionally, the Model 25 can have a standard System/360 I/O channel, that can be either a byte-multiplexor or a selector channel. For the most commonly used peripherals, such as a 2540 or 2560 card reader-punch, a 1403 printer, or 2311 or 2314 disk drives, optional internal attachments are provided. These attachments connect directly to their respective peripherals, and appear to the operating system as if the peripherals were channel-attached.

Most unusual about the 360/25 was a feature somewhat analogous to the IBM System/360 Model 44's integrated single disk storage drive, namely an integrated attachment.

=== Compatibility Features ===
The Model 25 provides an optional compatibility feature that helps users of IBM 1400 series computers migrate to System/360. With the additional Compatibility Feature hardware and Compatibility Support software under DOS/360, the IBM 1401/1440/1460 object programs can be run in the emulation mode, with little or no reprogramming.

== System configuration ==
The standard set of peripherals is available, although by this time customers had found their way to IBM-compatible alternatives.

A typical System/360 Model 25 configuration consists of:

- IBM 2025 CPU
- IBM 1052 console printer-keyboard
- IBM 2540 card reader-punch
- IBM 1403 printer
- One or more IBM 2311 or IBM 2314 disk drives
- One or more magnetic tape drives, either IBM 2415 or IBM 2401 model 1, attached to the selector channel

== Software ==
The typical operating system for the Model 25 was DOS/360, which was loaded from disk. Less common was TOS/360, which was loaded from tape, and, rarely, BPS, which was loaded from punched cards. Programming was mostly in the COBOL, RPG and Assembler languages for the commercial applications that were the predominant uses of this computer, but Fortran IV could also be used for the scientific and engineering applications, and PL/I was available.

== See also ==
- IBM mainframe
