= IBM 2922 =

The IBM 2922 Programmable Terminal is a Remote Job Entry (RJE) terminal introduced by IBM in 1972. The 2922 communicates using Binary Synchronous Communications (Bisync).

The 2922 and associated peripherals were RPQs; that is, special-order equipment not on the standard price list. The system is a repackaging of an IBM System/360 Model 20 and peripherals for use as a dedicated terminal.

== Standard components ==
The 2922-1 Terminal Control Unit (RPQ 810563) has the same instruction set architecture as the Model 20. It incorporates 8,192 bytes of 3.6 μs magnetic-core memory. The control unit also contains the Binary Synchronous Communications Adapter (BSCA) integrated into the Terminal Control Unit that supports a single line at speeds up to 7200 bits per second.

The 2922-2 Terminal Printer (RPQ 810564) is a repackaged 1403 printer. The printer uses a print chain and provides a page width of 132 characters using fanfold paper. The controls and indicators for the printer are located on the front panel of the Terminal Control Unit, except for a duplicate start key on the rear of the printer.

The 2922-3 Terminal Card Reader (RPQ 810565) is a repackaged 2501, an optical punched card reader for 80-column cards with a rated speed of 500 cards per minute. The controls and indicators for the card reader are located on the front panel of the Terminal Control Unit.

== Optional components ==
One IBM 2152 printer/keyboard could be attached to an adapter in the Terminal Control Unit. This device has a selectric print mechanism and resembles the 1052 printer/keyboard used as a console on many System/360 computers. It operates at 15.5 characters per second.

One IBM 1442 Model 5 card punch could be attached to an adapter in the Terminal Control Unit. The 1442 can punch 80-column cards at a rate of 91 cards per minute if all 80 columns are punched.

== Software ==
The 2922 has no disk; however, magnetic core has the property of retaining programs loaded from cards through power on-off cycles.

IBM supplied a remote job entry program for the 2922 as Type 2 Field Developed Program (FDP).

DOS/VS POWER Workstation Support for the IBM 2922 (FDP 5198-BBY) handles communication with a DOS/VS system using POWER software for remote job entry.

== Users ==
In 1974 Computerworld reported that the State of Mississippi was using six 2922 terminals to communicate with a central System/370 Model 145.
