= IBM 1442 =

IBM card reader and punch

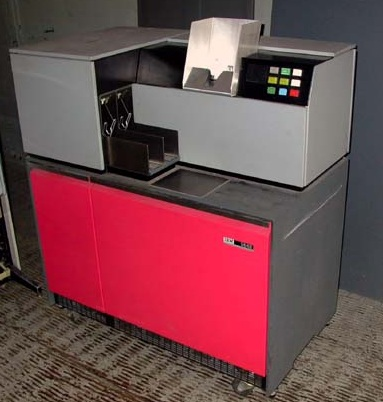
- IBM 1442 (also available in blue)
- Type: Punch card reader, or reader/writer (punch), or punch only
- Released: 1962; 64 years ago
- Related: IBM 1402 reader/punch; IBM 2501 reader

IBM 1442 is a combination IBM card reader and card punch. It reads and punches 80-column IBM-format punched cards and is used on the IBM 1440, the IBM 1130, the IBM 1800 and System/360 and is an option on the IBM System/3.

== Overview ==
The 1442 can read up to 400 cards per minute. Cards are read and punched one column at a time and binary cards are permitted. Cards are read using photocells, illuminated by fiber optics, unlike the IBM 1402, which uses wire brushes to read cards. It is even possible to create (but not read, except in Binary Mode) "IBM Doilies," cards with every possible hole punched. Few other pieces of IBM equipment could do this without sustaining damage.

There are two output stackers, located in the photo on the left lower side. One could program to select the output stacker for each card read, so it is possible to read cards and separate them into two groups. Cards are placed in the top hopper ("face down, nine-edge leading") and a plate is added on the top of the cards. They are read thru and come out to one of the left lower stackers.

The 1442 does not print on the top of the cards; it just punches what characters the columns contains. An older unit record machine, the IBM 557 interpreter, can be used off-line for this function.

== Models ==
Not all models have both read and punch features.

=== Reader/Punch models ===
- The 1442 Model 1 reads cards at 80 cards per minute (cpm) and punches at 50 to 270 cpm, depending on the number of columns punched. One stacker is standard and a second is optional.
- The 1442 Model 2 reads cards at 400 cpm and punches from 91 to 360 cpm. Two stackers are standard.
- The 1442 Model 6 attaches to an IBM System/3 or IBM 1130, reads 300 cpm and punches 80 columns per second.
- The 1442 Model 7 attaches to an IBM System/3 or IBM 1130, reads 400 cpm and punches 180 columns per second.
- The 1442 Model N1 attaches to the IBM System/360 and IBM System/370, reads 400 cards per minute and punches 160 columns per second.

=== Reader models ===
The following units were not designed to punch cards:

- The 1442 Model 3 attaches to an IBM 1410 or IBM 7010 computer system. It reads cards at 400 cpm. One stacker is standard on the Model 3.
- The 1442 Model 4 attaches to an IBM 1440 computer system. It reads cards at 400 cpm. Two stackers are standard on the Model 4.

=== Punch only ===
- The 1442 Model 5 is a punch-only device that attaches to the IBM 2922 Programmable Terminal and to the IBM System/360 Model 20. It has one stacker and can punch at a maximum rate of 160 columns per second, which is 91 to 355 cards per minute.
- The 1442 Model N2 is a punch-only device that attaches to the IBM System/360 (except the model 20) and IBM System/370. It punches at 160 columns per second.

== 2501/1442 combination ==
The 1442 has two weaknesses for those wanting more throughput:

- Maximum input speed is 400 cards per minute
- The 1442 needs attention for every column of data.

By combining the higher speed IBM 2501 card reader and a punch-only IBM 1442, the 1442's limitations are overcome:

- faster input
- the 2501 is buffered and therefore will not overrun if the channel is too busy with other devices to give it attention whenever a column has been read.

== See also ==
- IBM 2501
- IBM 2540
