= Haanstra (surname) =

Haanstra is a surname, and may refer to:

- Bert Haanstra (1916 – 1997), Dutch film director
- John Haanstra (1926 – 1969), electrical engineer and a computer industry executive
