= Lace card =

Punch card with all holes punched

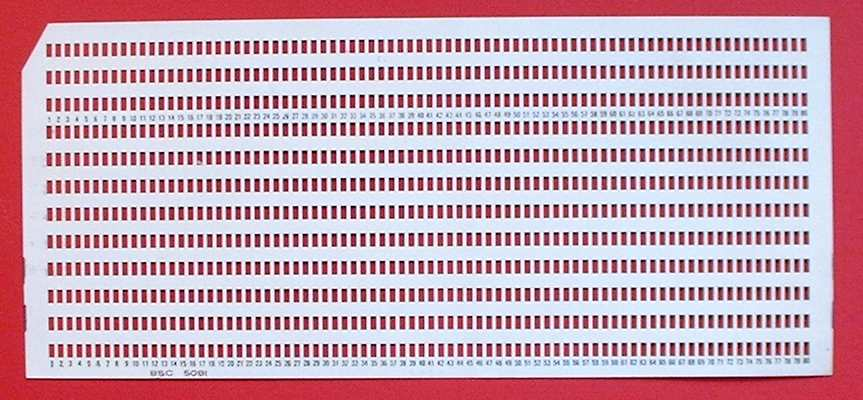
A lace card from the early 1970s

A lace card (also called a whoopee card, ventilator card, flyswatter card, or IBM doily) is a punched card with all holes punched. They were mainly used as practical jokes to cause disruption in card readers. Card readers tended to jam when a lace card was inserted, as the resulting card had insufficient structural integrity to avoid buckling inside the mechanism. Card punchers could also jam trying to produce cards with all holes punched, owing to power-supply problems. When a lace card was fed through the reader, a card knife or card saw (a flat tool used with punched card readers and card punches) was needed to clear the jam.

== See also ==
- Black fax
- Christmas tree packet
- Denial of service
- List of practical joke topics
