= Card saw =

Tool for card reader maintenance

A card saw, also called a card knife or card removal tool, is a tool used to remove jammed punched cards from a card feed in a punched card reader.

Machines that use punched cards, such as sorters or tabulators, often automatically feed cards through an automated hopper to consume input. The cards are fed mechanically through a reader. Due to their physical properties, they may jam the feed. A card which lacks sufficient structural integrity to be fed through the machine may buckle or tear; a card with a hanging chad or other deformity could be too thick to pass through a feed.

A card saw designed for the machine being used could then be employed to catch and mechanically remove the jammed card from the feed. The card saw is a flat metal tool with a flat hook at one end; it can mechanically push the remnants of the jammed card from the machine, and also pull remaining paper out with the hook. Following this, card processing can resume.
