= IBM 3505 =

IBM computer peripherals

IBM 3505 and IBM 3525
- Type: Punched card reader and controller (3505); Punched card reader/punch (3525)
- Released: 1971; 55 years ago
- Predecessor: IBM 2540

The IBM 3505 is a reader for 80-column punched cards. It can read cards punched in EBCDIC or column binary at up to 1200 cards per minute (CPM). The IBM 3525 is a multi-function punched card device, capable of reading, punching, and printing on punched cards. The 3505 contains an integrated control unit that attaches to a System/370 byte multiplexer, selector, or block multiplexer channel. An optional feature of the 3505 allows the control unit to also control a 3525, although the two are separately-addressed devices.

The 3505/3525 units attach to a System/370 Model 135 and up, or to a System/360 Model 195.

The 3505 and 3525 were developed at the IBM General Systems Division in Rochester, Minnesota in 1971.

== 3505 ==
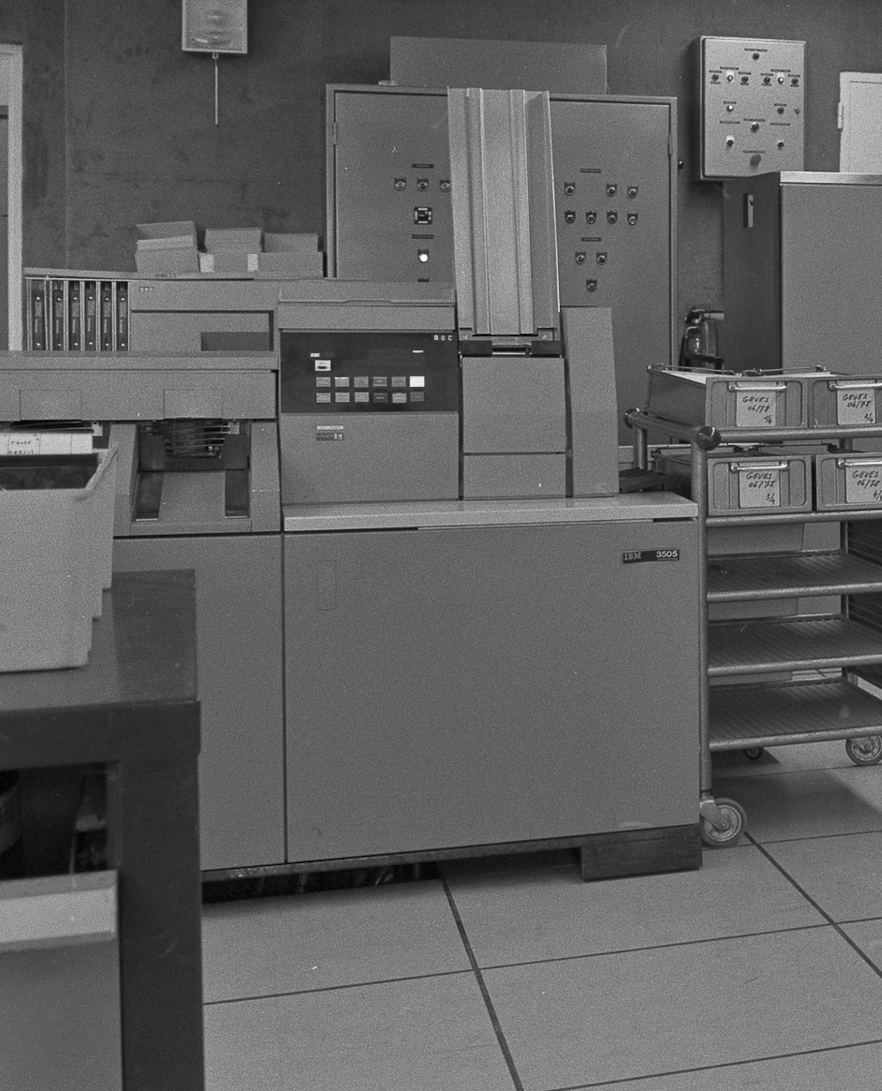
IBM 3505 Card Reader (partially visible)

The 3505 is a card reader and controller for optional 3525.

The 3505 features a 3000-card input hopper and two 1750-card output stackers. When one stacker becomes full the reader automatically switches to the other, if available, to allow the operator to unload the cards without stopping the machine. A third stacker was available as an option. Cards are read optically. The 3505 model B1 reads cards at up to 1200 CPM, the B2 at up to 800 CPM.

An optional feature of the 3505 was available to allow the 3505 to read optically-marked cards. The "read column eliminate" option allows the reader to ignore data punched in selected columns, including data that would normally cause an error.

== 3525 ==
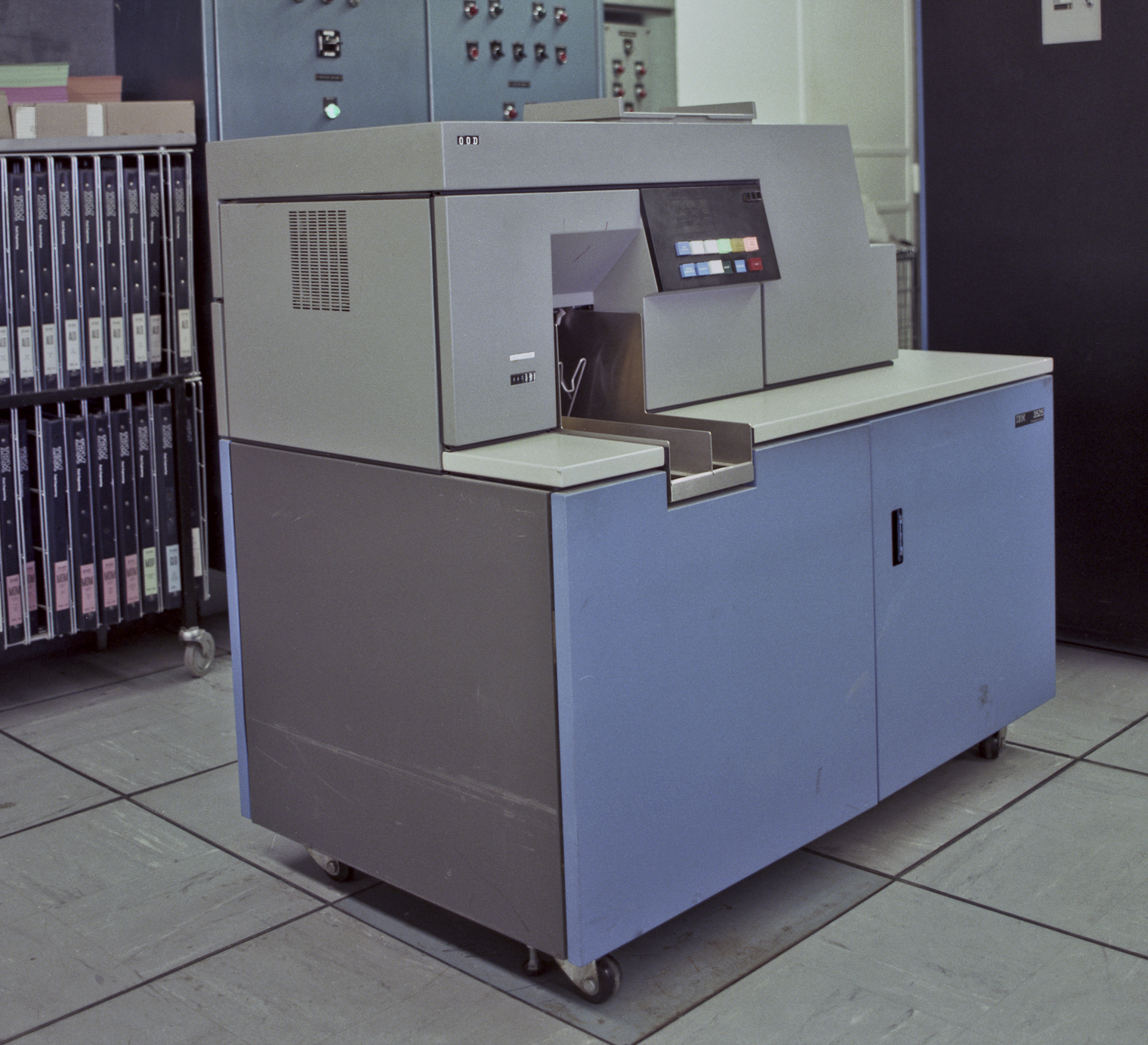
IBM 3525 Card Punch

The 3525 attaches to a computer through a control unit in the 3505.

It has an input hopper with a capacity of 1200 cards, and two output stackers, each holding up to 1200 cards. Cards may be selected into either stacker under program control. A full stacker stops the punch, awaiting operator intervention. A third stacker, the "reject stacker", receives cards that were punched incorrectly. The reject stacker holds up to 200 cards. The 3525 model P1 punches at 100 CPM, the P2 at 200 CPM, and the P3 at 300 CPM.

Optionally, the 3525 has a read feature that can read cards prior to punching. An optional print feature allows the 3525 to print on cards following reading or punching. Up to 25 lines of 64 characters can be printed, using an interchangeable 64-character set.
