= IBM 1402 =

Computer input/output device for punched cards

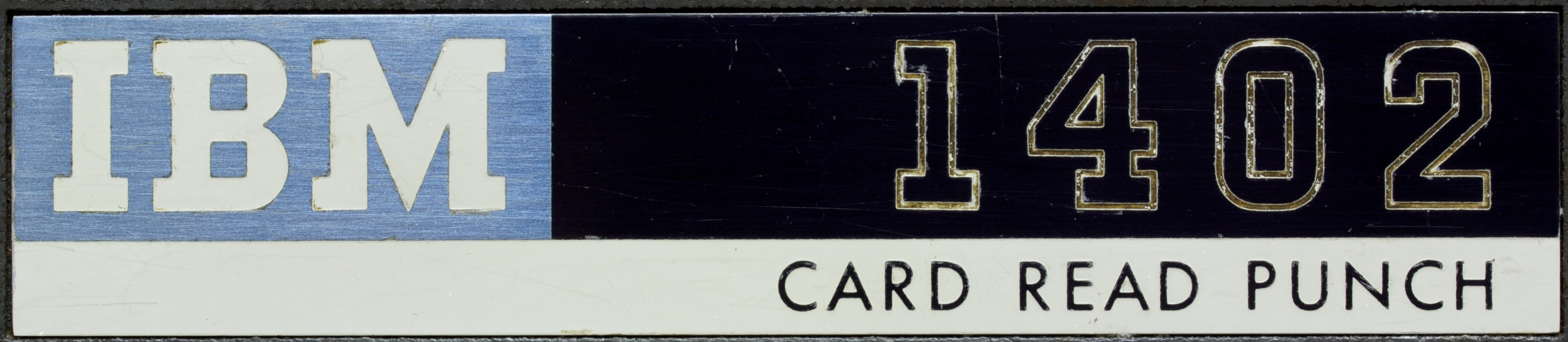

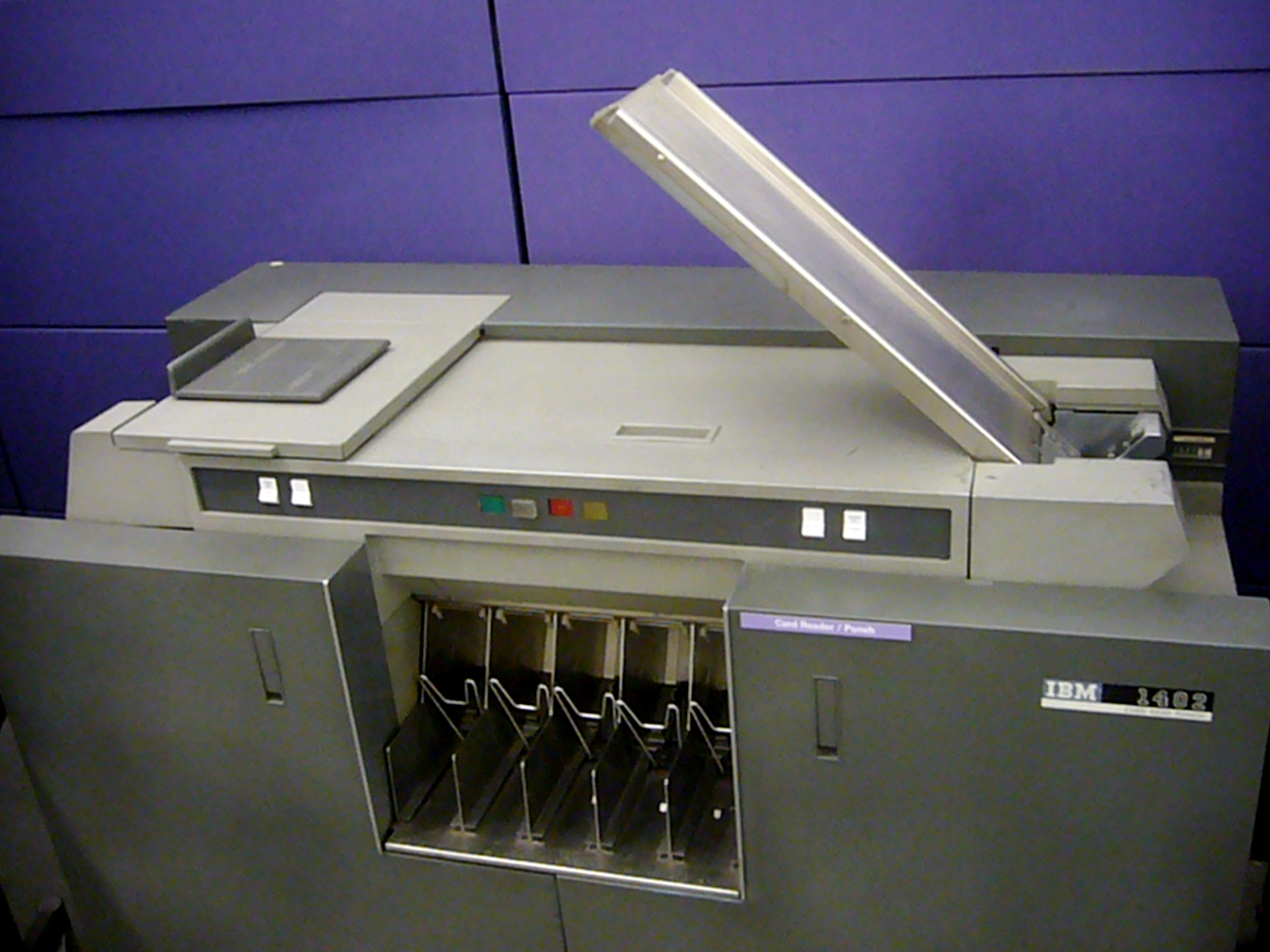
- IBM 1402 at the Computer History Museum
- Type: Punch card reader/writer
- Released: 1959; 67 years ago
- Successor: IBM 2540
- Related: IBM 1622

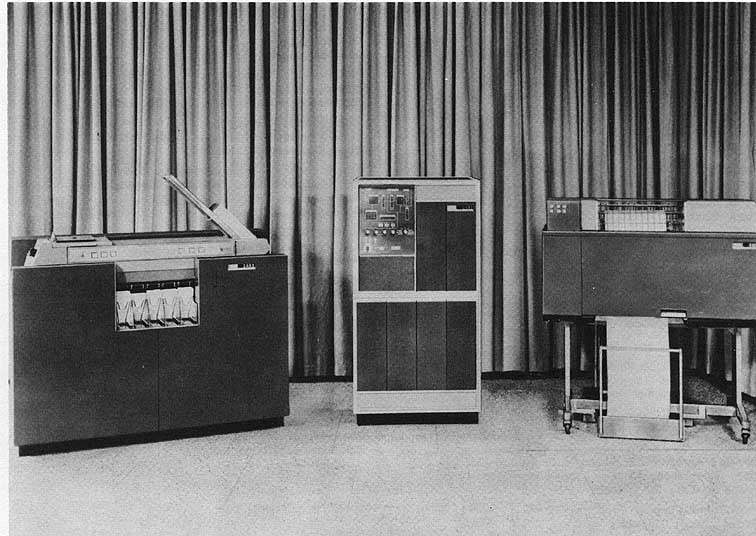
The IBM 1402, left, as part of the IBM 1401 Data Processing System

IBM 1402 card reader input tray

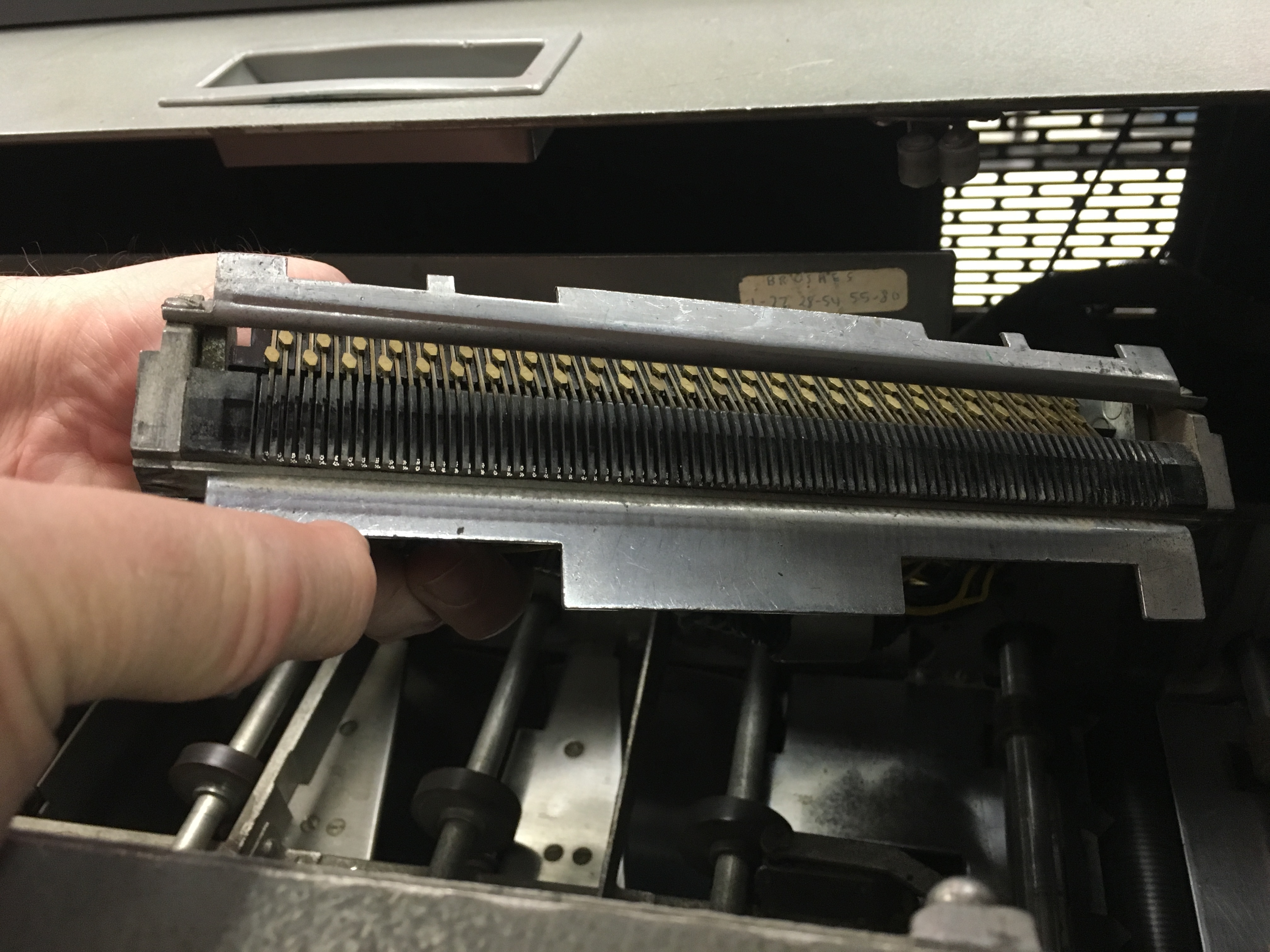
Read brush assembly for an IBM 1402. There are 80 contacts, one for each column on a standard IBM punched card.

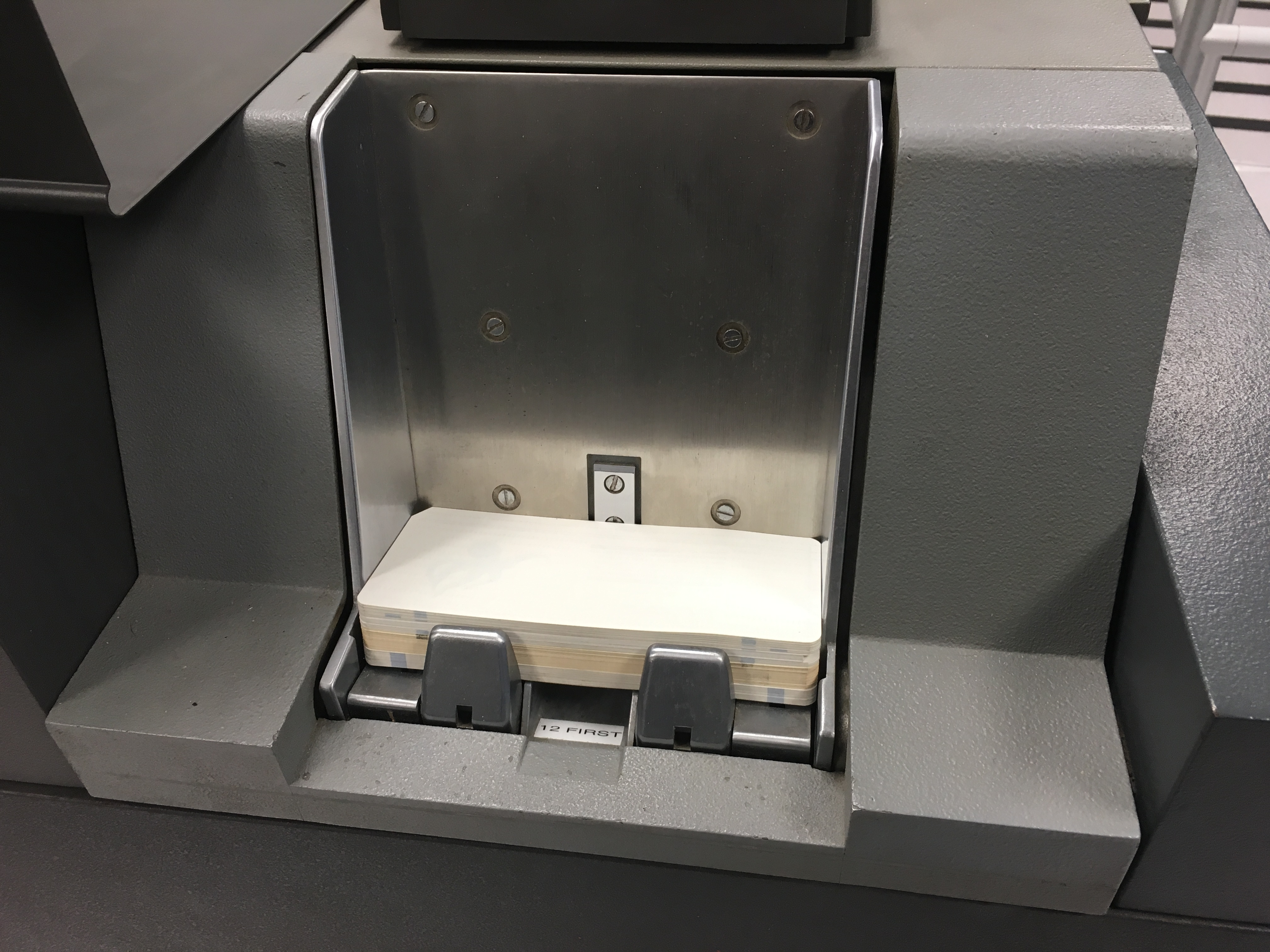
Input hopper for the IBM 1402's card punch

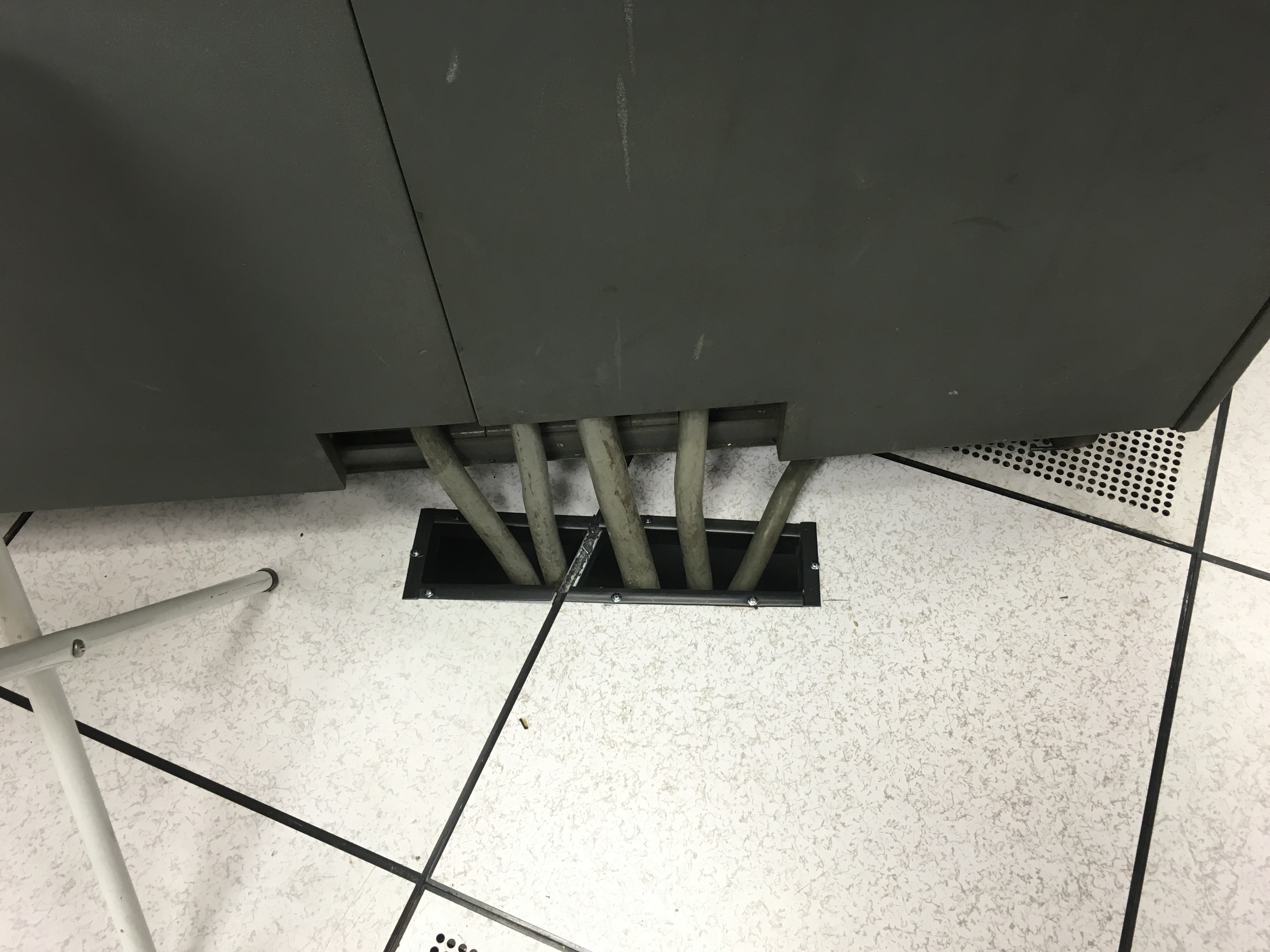
Cables entering the back of the IBM 1402

The IBM 1402 was a high-speed card reader/punch introduced on October 5, 1959 as a peripheral input/output device for the IBM 1401 computer. It was later used with other computers of the IBM 1400 series and IBM 7000 series product lines. It was adapted as the IBM 1622 Card Read-Punch for the IBM 1620 and provided the basic design for the models 2501, 2520 and 2540 equipment used with the IBM System/360 product line.

== Specifications ==
=== Card reader ===
- Card read speed up to 800 punched cards per minute (models 1, 2 and 3) or 450 cards per minute (models 4, 5 and 6).
- Card input file for 3,000 cards (models 1, 2, 3, 4 and 6) or feed hopper for 1,200 cards (model 5).
- Three stackers (NR, 1, 2/8) with approximately 1,000-card capacity hold cards after they are read.

=== Card punch ===
- Card punch speed up to 250 cards per minute (all models).
- Feed hopper for 1,200 cards (all models).
- Three stackers (NP, 4, 2/8) of approximately 1,000-card capacity after cards are punched. The 2/8 stacker is shared by the card reader and punch, but timing considerations make it difficult to use for merging operations.
- Option to read from the punch feed.

=== Punched card format ===
The 1402 uses IBM 80-column punched card format, although an option was available to process 51-column cards. A column binary option allowed cards with any combination of holes to be read and punched.

== Error checking ==
Both the reader and punch mechanisms count the number of holes in each column at a separate station. An error is indicated and the mechanism stops (if the I/O check stop switch is on) if the number of holes counted at the read station differs from the number of holes counted at the first, check station (for reading) or punched at the first station (for punching).

In addition, when not operating in column-binary mode, the reader indicates an error and stops (if the I/O check stop switch is on) if the punch combination in any column does not indicate a valid character.
