= IBM 2540 =

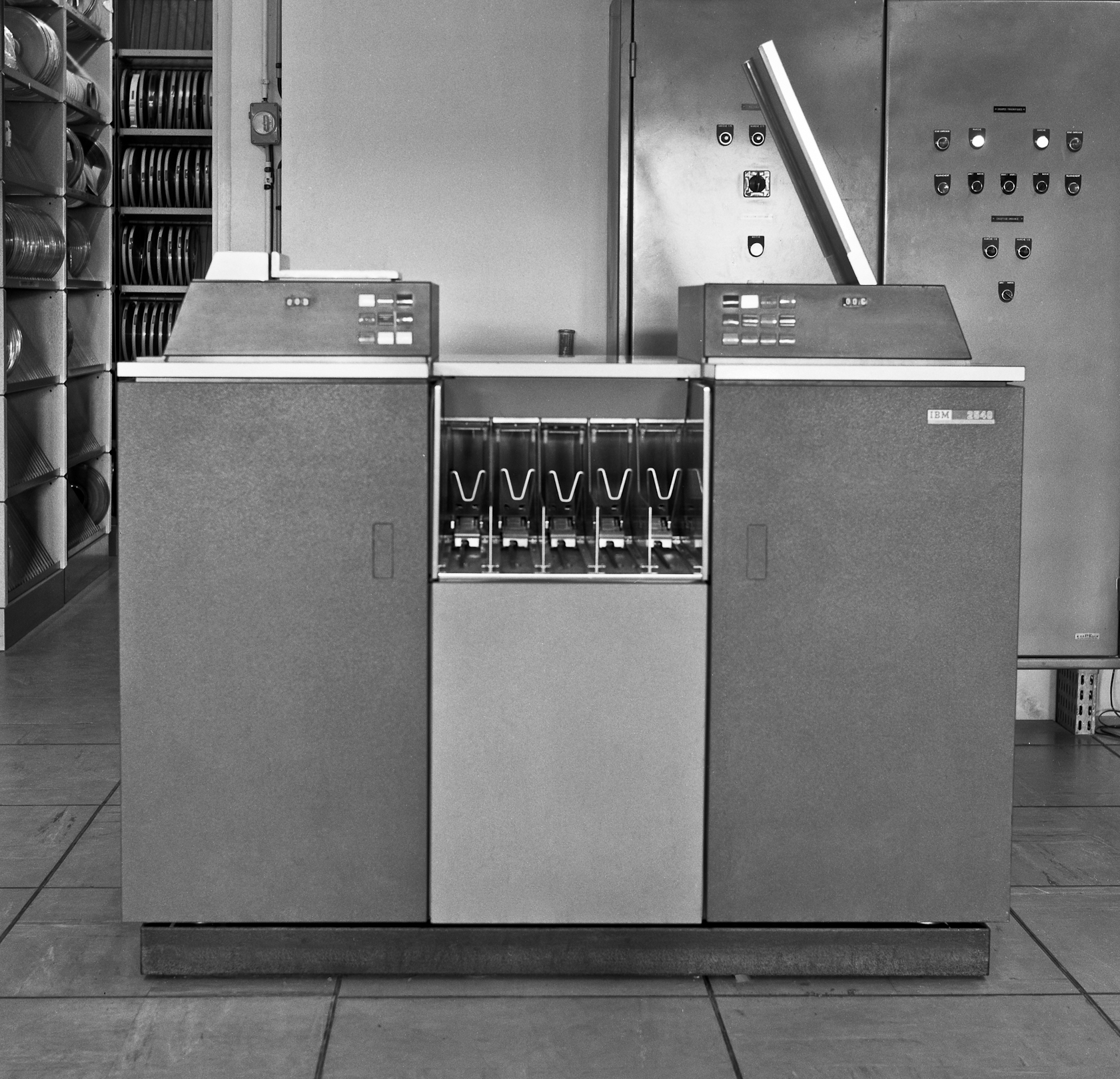
- IBM 2540 reader(right)/punch (left)
- Type: Punch card reader/writer
- Released: 1965; 61 years ago
- Predecessor: IBM 1402
- Successor: IBM 3505
- Related: IBM 2501

The IBM 2540 is a punched-card computer peripheral manufactured by IBM Corporation for use of System/360 and later computer systems. The 2540 was designed by IBM's Data Processing Division in Rochester, Minnesota, and was introduced in 1965. The 2540 can read punched-cards at 1000 cards per minute (CPM) and punch at 300 CPM. The 2540 is based on the design of the older, slightly slower, 1402.

== Description ==
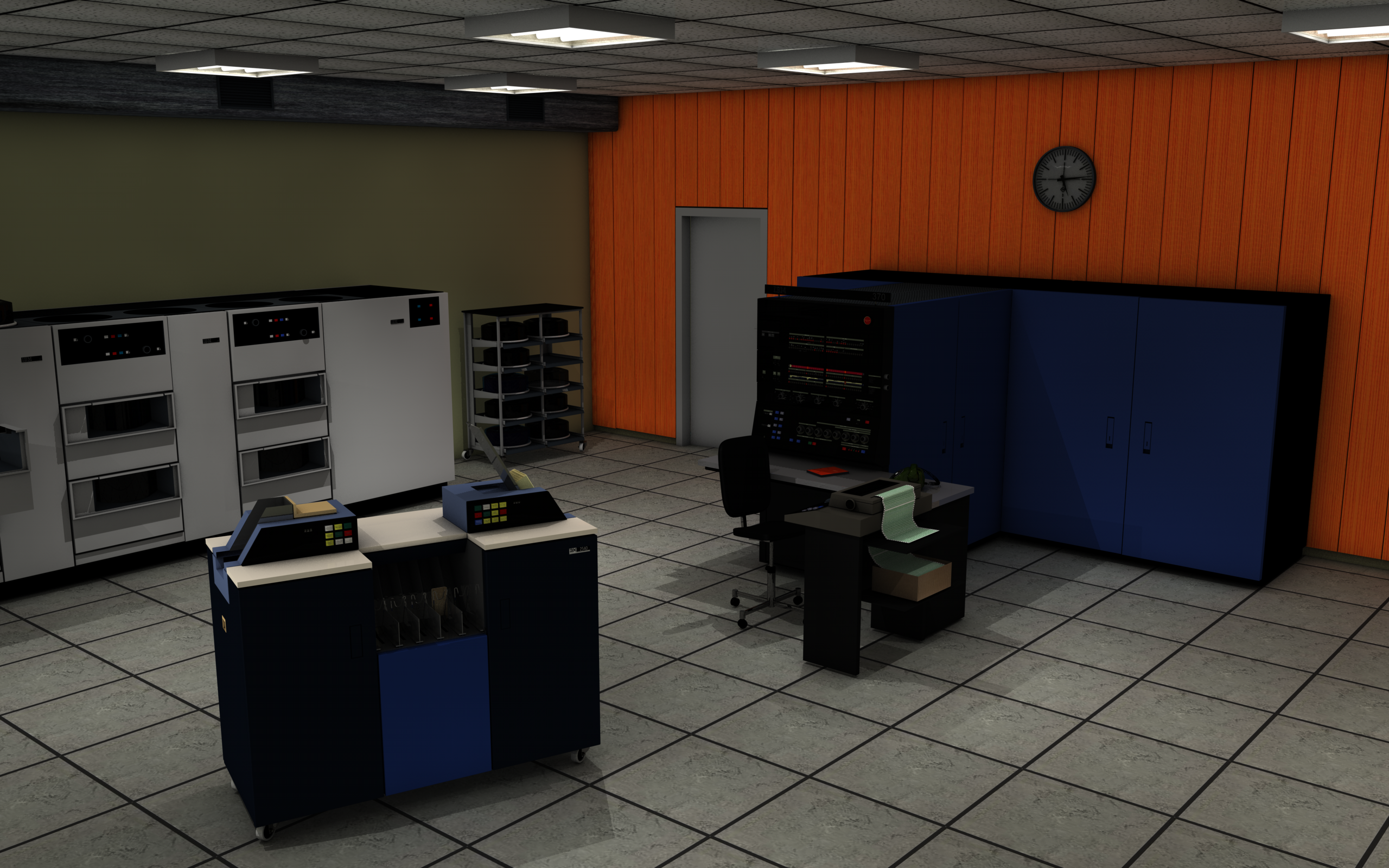
IBM 2540 card read/punch in an IBM System/370 Model 145 installation

The 2540 attaches to a System/360 multiplexer or selector channel through an IBM 2821 Control Unit. A standard 2540 processes standard IBM 80 column punched cards. The card reader (2540R) and card punch (2540P) devices are separately addressable and function independently. The 2540 normally reads and punches EBCDIC data, called data-mode 1.

=== Card reader ===
On the right side of the device is the reader, consisting of an input hopper holding approximately 3100 cards, and three output stackers (right to left – R1, R2, and RP3) each holding approximately 1350 cards. Cards can be directed to an output stacker under program control.

=== Card punch ===
On the left side of the device is the punch, with an input hopper holding about 1350 cards, and three output stackers (left to right – P1, P2, and RP3) each holding 1350 cards. The center stacker (RP3) is shared between the reader and the punch, but is not intended to be used by both at the same time. Cards can be directed to an output stacker under program control. The card is read after punching to ensure that the data was punched correctly.

== Special features ==
- Column binary – this feature, data-mode 2, allows all possible combinations of holes to be read or punched in a column.
- Punch-feed-read – this feature allows input cards to be read by the punch unit and data simultaneously punched into the same card. This feature was not normally supported by spooling software.
- 51-column Interchangeable Read Feed – this feature allows the 2540 to read 51-column "stub" cards in addition to standard 80-column cards. Operator setup was required to change card size, so the two sizes could not be intermixed. Installation of this feature reduced the capacities of stackers R1 and R2 to around 800 cards, and reduced read speed to 800 CPM.

== Successors ==
With the introduction of System/370 IBM announced the improved 3525 card punch and the 3505 card reader in 1971.

== See also ==
- List of IBM products
- IBM 1442
