= IBM System/360 Model 22 =

Low-end IBM computer model from 1970s

- Manufacturer: International Business Machines Corporation (IBM)
- Product family: System/360
- Released: April 7, 1970
- Introductory price: $246,000 ($5,600/month) (for the 24K model)
- Discontinued: October 7, 1977
- Memory: 24 or 32K Core
- Website: Official website IBM Archives

The IBM System/360 Model 22 was an IBM mainframe from the System/360 line.

== History ==
The Model 22 was a cut-down (economy) version (Note: IBM description: "... small-system economy. It provided an economical way for users to...") of the Model 30 computer, aimed at bolstering the low end of the range.

The 360/22 was announced less than a year after the June 22, 1970 withdrawal of the 360/30, and it lasted six and a half years, from April 7, 1971, to October 7, 1977.

=== Comparisons ===
Model	Announced	Withdrawn	Scientific performance (kIPS) (Note: Performance calculated (not measured) based on a mix of instructions typical of scientific applications ("Gibson Mix") with the results in kilo Instructions Per Second (kIPS) per Longbottom, Roy. "Computer Speeds From Instruction Mixes - pre-1960 to 1971". except for M95 and M195. The latter based upon estimates of performance relative to M65 from Pugh.)	Commercial performance (kIPS) (Note: using commercial instruction mix ("ADP Mix"))	CPU Bandwidth (MB/sec)	Memory (Note: K=1,024) (model) (Note: Lower case "M")
22	1971	1977	10	28	1.3	24, 32
25	1968	1977	9.7	25	1.1	16, 24, 32, 48
30	1964	1970	10.2	29	1.3	8 (C30), 16 (D30), 24 (DC30), (Note: Note: The DC30 was added in the second/FASTER iteration of the 360/30); 32 (E30), 64 (F30)
40	1964	1970	40	75	3.2	16 (D40), 32 (E40), 64 (F40), 128 (G40), 256 (H40)

== Models ==
Only two models were offered: 24K or 32K of memory. (Note: by comparison, the initial offering of the 360/30 included FOUR models: 8K, 16K, 32K, 64K)
