= John Haanstra =

American electrical engineer (1928–1969)

- Born: John Wilson Haanstra; May 12, 1926; San Francisco, California, U.S.
- Died: August 16, 1969 (aged 43) near Clines Corners, New Mexico, U.S.
- Education: University of California, Berkeley
- Occupations: Electrical engineer; computer industry executive
- Spouse: June Hill
- Children: 3

John Wilson Haanstra (May 12, 1926 – August 16, 1969) was an American electrical engineer and a computer industry executive. Haanstra was notable for his chairmanship of IBM's SPREAD (Note: Systems Programming, Research, Engineering, And Development) task force whose work led to the creation of the System/360 product line.

== Early career ==
Born in San Francisco, California, Haanstra graduated from the University of California, Berkeley in 1949 with a degree in electrical engineering. In 1950 he went to work for IBM in Poughkeepsie, New York. During the Korean War he was recalled to serve in the Navy. Following his discharge he rejoined IBM in June 1952 in the then new San Jose Laboratory.

== RAMAC disk drive and system ==
Initially Haanstra was one of the engineers and then a leader in the development of the RAMAC 350 disk drive. He then became responsible for designing the 1956 IBM 305 RAMAC system which was the first commercial computer system using a hard disk drive.

== 1401 and System/360 ==
In 1957 he was promoted to assistant general manager of General Products Division (GPD), and in 1961 he became president of the division. There he oversaw the deployment of the highly successful 1401 computer system. Also in 1961 IBM vice president T. Vincent Learson established the 12-person SPREAD task group, with Haanstra as chairman and Bob O. Evans as vice chairman. The result, a 26-page report, was published in December, 1961, and "became the basis for the System/360 series and its operating system." Haanstra agreed that GPD would produce the low-end model of System/360 that became the Model 30. However, he was not fully on board with the "New Product Line" (NPL) as System/360 was known at the time. To compete with the newly announced 1401-compatible Honeywell 200 system, Haanstra had GPD secretly produce a plan for a much faster 1401S system, which he presented to IBM President Thomas Watson Jr. in January, 1964, along with a suggestion that he delay the introduction of the Model 30. Although Watson praised the plan, Haanstra was removed as president of GPD, and the 360 project continued as planned.

== Later career at IBM ==
Despite his demotion (Evans calls it "IBM purgatory"), in 1965 Haanstra was appointed president of IBM's newly formed Systems Development Division (SDD), responsible for all IBM computer research and development. Later that year, however, delays in System/360 manufacturing caused Watson to remove Haanstra from SDD and assign him to a committee called the "four horsemen" along with John Gibson, Clarence E. Frizzell, and Henry E. Cooley. The committee was to coordinate all IBM manufacturing and laboratory locations and "decide how to meet System/360 manufacturing commitments." In 1966 Bob Evans lobbied and had Haanstra appointed vice president of the IBM Federal Systems Division (FSD) Federal Systems Center.

== General Electric ==
In August 1967 Haanstra left IBM and went to work for General Electric's computer division in Phoenix, Arizona as special assistant to the head of GE's Information Systems Division, and in 1968 he was appointed head of advanced planning

At General Electric Haanstra contributed to the design of Project Charlie, a line of medium sized machines intended to compete with System/360. He recommended the development of microcoded peripheral controllers rather than hard wired units. It is likely that it was on his recommendation that emitter-coupled logic (ECL) was chosen as the technology to be used for the new system.

In 1968 Haanstra assumed responsibility for the "GE655" project in Phoenix, later the GE6000 that became the Honeywell 6000 series.

== Death ==
In 1969, flying his private plane back to Phoenix from a trip to Vermont, Haanstra, his wife June (Hill) Haanstra, and their son Glenn were killed when the plane crashed near Clines Corners, New Mexico on August 16, 1969, on the final leg between Oklahoma City, Oklahoma, and Phoenix. Two other children were not traveling with the couple at the time.
