= Request price quotation =

IBM designation for sales of non-standard products

Request price quotation or RPQ is a long-standing IBM designation for a product or component that is potentially available, but that is not on the "standard" price list. Typical RPQ offerings are custom interfaces, hardware modifications, research or experimental systems, or variable-cost items. In the days of IBM's large mainframes, e.g. the System/360 and System/370 series, many unusual features were flagged as "RPQ".

A special-order software item is known as a Programming Request Price Quotation or PRPQ.

== Examples ==
The standard punched card code for the groupmark character on the IBM 1401 computer system used punches in rows 12, 7, and 8 of a card column (written as 12-7-8). The older IBM 705 computer used 12-5-8 for this character. An RPQ was available for the 1401 for compatibility that allowed the system to read or punch the 705 code rather than the standard code. Since not all 1401 users would need this feature it was marketed as an RPQ.

The features used by the Compatible Time-Sharing System to support time-sharing on the IBM 7090 and IBM 7094 were offered as RPQs.

== See also ==
- Request for proposal
