= IBM 1440 =

1962 IBM computer

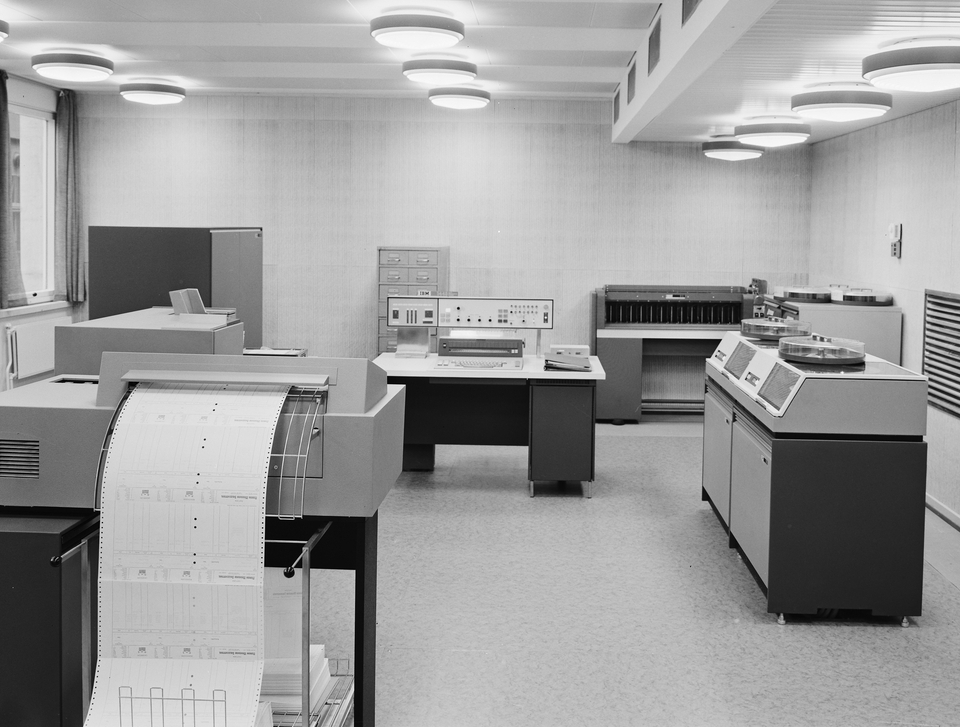
- Manufacturer: International Business Machines Corporation (IBM)
- Product family: IBM 1400
- Released: 1962; 64 years ago
- Predecessor: IBM 1401

The IBM 1440 computer was announced by IBM October 11, 1962. This member of the IBM 1400 series was described many years later as "essentially a lower-cost version of the 1401", and programs for the 1440 could easily be adapted to run on the IBM 1401.

Despite what IBM described as "special features ... to meet immediate data processing requirements and ... to absorb increased demands," the 1440 did not quite attain the same commercial success as the 1401, and it was withdrawn on February 8, 1971.

Author Emerson Pugh wrote that the 1440 "did poorly in the marketplace because it was initially offered without the ability to attach magnetic tape units as well." (referring to offering both tape and disk).

== System configuration ==
External image
- IBM 1440 system

The IBM 1441 processing unit (CPU) contained arithmetic and logic circuits and up to 16,000 alphanumeric storage positions.

The console was either a Model 1 or, when an electric typewriter was added, a Model 2, of the IBM 1447 operator's console.

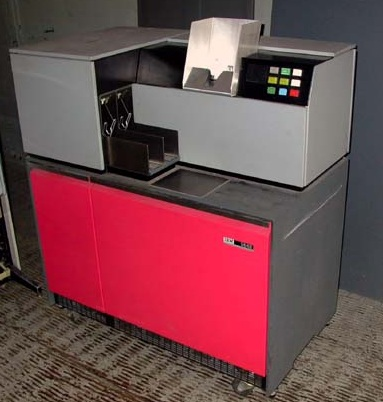
IBM 1442

== Peripherals ==
The following peripherals were available:

- IBM 1442 card reader/punch
  - Model 1 read up to 300 cards a minute and punched up to 80 columns a second
  - Model 2 read up to 400 cards a minute and punched up to 160 columns a second
  - Model 4, a read-only unit, read up to 400 cards/minute.

An IBM 1440 could be configured with a choice of:

Model 4 (lowest cost)
Model 4, for reading, and a Model 1 or 2 as a second unit

- IBM 1443 flying typebar printer
  - Basic rate of 150 lines a minute and up to 430 lines a minute, depending on typebar
  - Interchangeable typebars having character sets of 13, 39, 52, and 63 characters
- IBM 1311 disk drive
  - Capacity for 2 million characters in each removable pack
    - With optional "Move Track Record" feature, capacity is increased to 2,980,000 characters in each pack
  - Each pack weighed less than 10 lb (5 kg).
  - Up to five 1311 drives
- Tape drives
  - The IBM 7335 tape drive, available for use with the 1440, was introduced by IBM on October 10, 1963.

== Software ==
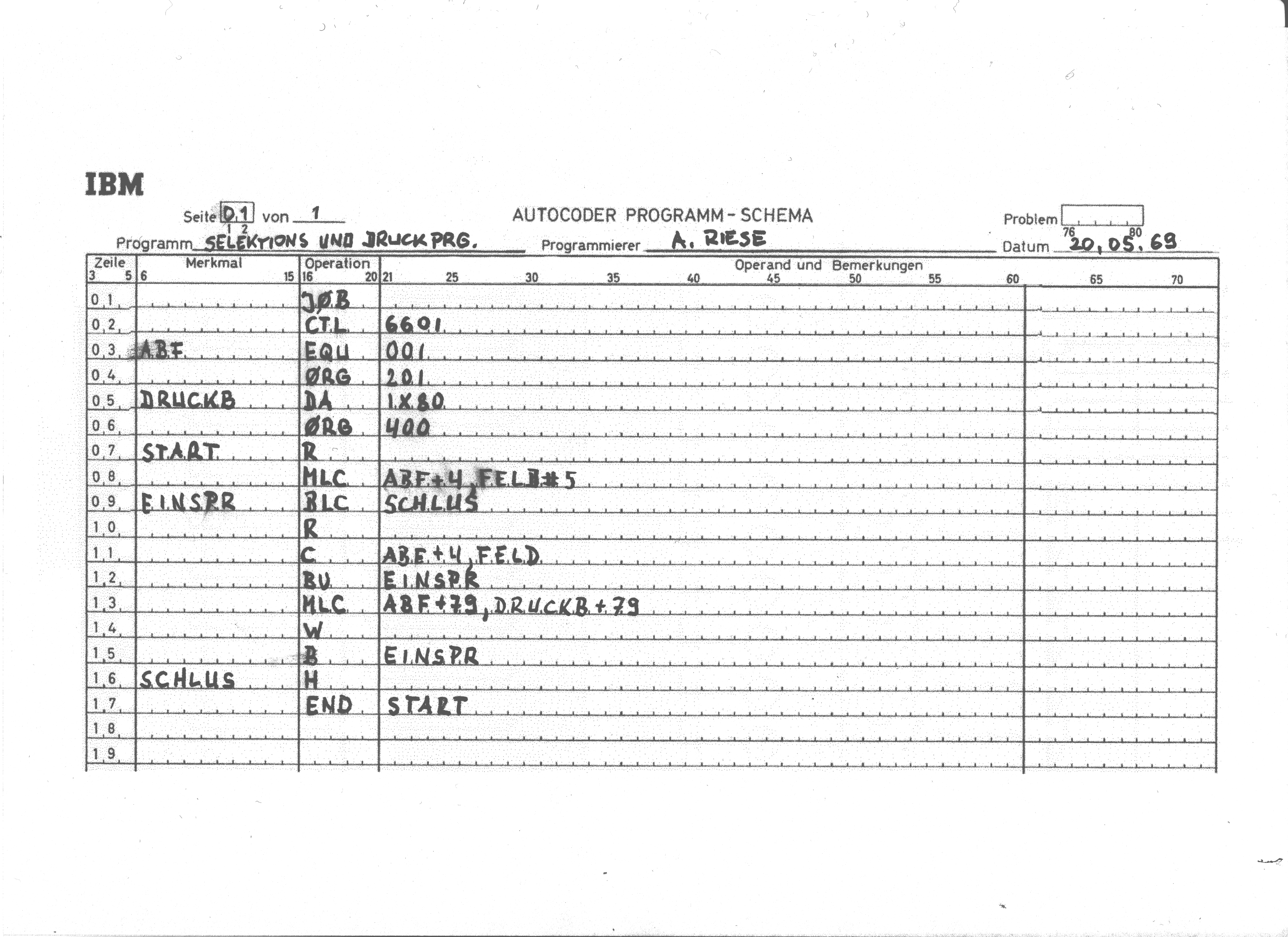
IBM 1440 Autocoder was the Assembly language provided by IBM Click on above image to enlarge

IBM 1440 Autocoder was the assembly language provided by IBM. An IOCS was also provided, as was a collection of "Disk File Organization Routines".

== Pricing ==
The cost and rental rate were:

- Purchase price: $90,000 and up, depending on system configuration.
- Rental rate: $1,500 and up, monthly rental, depending on system configuration.

== Installations ==
Notable installations included a high-end 1440 at the Chicago Police Department installed by reformist superintendent Orlando Winfield Wilson in the early 1960s.

In the 1960s, Polish ZOWAR (ZETO Warszawa) was officially the first customer for IBM in Poland after WWII, despite the Iron Curtain.

In 2012, the TechWorks! Prototype Workshop of the Center for Technology & Innovation (CT&I) in Binghamton, New York successfully resurrected a 1440 system including a CPU and console, a 1311 disk drive, and a 1442 card reader/punch.

An example of a more fully configured 1440 was:

- five disk drives
- two magnetic tape drives
- two card reader-punches
- one high-speed printer
- an optical reader (to transfer specially coded medical data forms to magnetic tape)
