= IBM Audio Response Units =

Early interactive voice response units developed by IBM

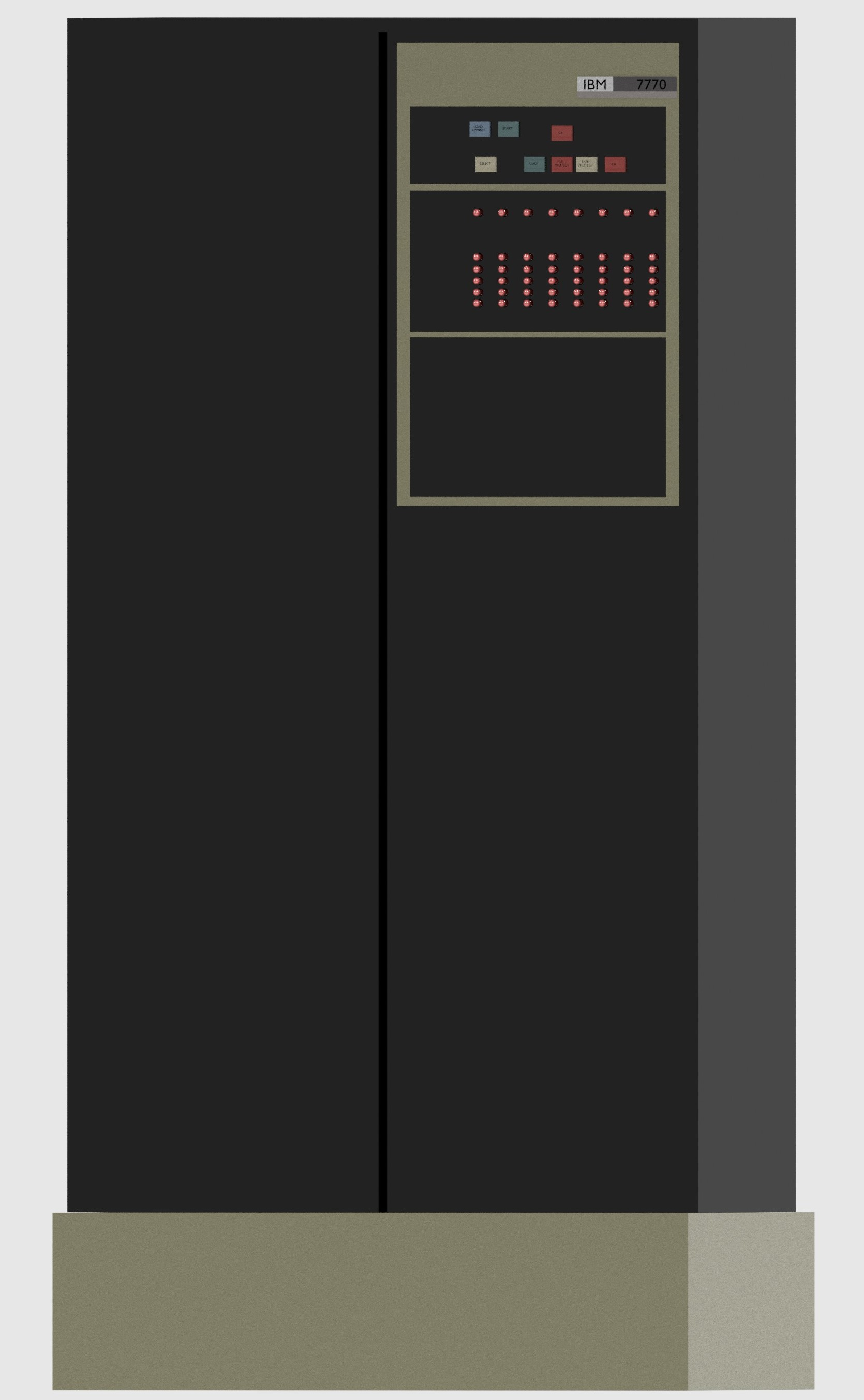
- Introduced: January 1964
- Discontinued: August 1982

The IBM 7770 and IBM 7772 Audio Response Units are an early form of interactive voice response (IVR) technology. They allowed users to interact directly with an IBM Mainframe using only a touch-tone telephone or a terminal which could generate tones. They are notable for being part of a number of first of a kind IT solutions and also for enabling what is described as the "world's first talking computer".

Despite these products being considered at one point the "industry standard" with up to a 90% market share, IBM did not develop any new products to replace them.

== Operation ==
A user could send an inquiry (or submit data) to an IBM Audio Response Unit (ARU) in one of four ways:

- A touch-tone telephone
- An inquiry-type terminal
- An IBM 1001 Data Transmission Terminal.
- An IBM 2721 Portal Audio Terminal

The inquiry was made using a series of numeric and control characters. The Audio Response Unit would pass these serially to the attached Mainframe and the response from the Mainframe would be sent back as codes, corresponding to the words that needed to be spoken as the response. The ARU would look up these codes and play them to the user as spoken words. The inquiry itself could be either a data lookup, such as a customer's bank account balance or a credit check result; or it could be a sort of data entry, such as the ID of an absent student, or a retail store order (see example customers below).

== IBM 7770 ==
The IBM 7770 was announced in 1964 with first shipments planned for first quarter 1965. Rental pricing started at US$1200 per month while the purchase price started at US$57,600. The IBM 7770 was manufactured by IBM in Kingston New York.

=== Architecture ===
The IBM 7770 consists of three functions: inquiry; digital control; audio output.

- The inquiry section receives a digital inquiry of up to 40 digits from the terminal via the send/receive equipment. The inquiry section translates the incoming data into BCD, assembles it in the buffer associated with the inquiring line, and passes it to the digital control section for transfer to the CPU. An inquiry is considered complete when no further data is received for five consecutive seconds.
- The digital control section manages data flow between the CPU and the IBM 7770. Once the CPU has processed the inquiry, the digital control section transfers the composed response message to the buffer associated with the inquiring line.
- The audio output section generates the spoken response. Under control of the digital control section, vocabulary word addresses are retrieved from the buffer and the corresponding words are read from the drum, amplified, and sent to the inquiring terminal. The maximum response message length is 38 word addresses, terminated by a group mark.

=== Vocabulary ===
The IBM 7770 vocabulary is stored on a magnetic drum. The spoken words are prerecorded in analog form on a magnetic cylinder IBM called a rotor. The rotor is designed to be interchangeable, allowing the user to change the vocabulary by installing one with different recordings. Each word is encoded on a separate track on the drum, which is 4 in (10 cm) in diameter and 10 in (25 cm) long and rotates at 120 rpm (one revolution every 500 ms).

As part of ordering the machine the customer had to include the vocabulary order. IBM had a master vocabulary of words frequently used in different industries, including the numbers 0 through 9 and the letters A through Z. Customers could select entries from this master vocabulary to create their own word set. IBM would record the words on the rotor based on the customer order. There was no option for the user to record the words themselves.

- Users could select either a male or female voice. As an example, the Michigan Credit Union League selected a female voice they called Connie, which they described as a "pleasant girls voice".
- Users were allowed to specify up to 32 words by default, expandable to 48, 63, 79, 95, 111, or 127 words. The Model 1 is limited to a maximum of 126 words, the Model 2 is limited to 127 words and the Model 3 is limited to 128 words.
- Lengthy words or words with many syllables that take more than 500 ms to say had to be split across multiple tracks. Although the track addresses containing the parts of the word did not need to be consecutive, the addresses had to be presented to the 7770 in sequential order. Conversely, a single track could contain several short monosyllabic words (a "phrase") if they could be spoken together in less than 500 ms.
- One track is reserved for a silent pause, which provides 500 ms of silence for spacing between words. Additional tracks are reserved for control purposes: the Model 1 reserves three tracks and the Model 2 reserves two.
- Letters and numbers (A to Z and 0 to 9) could be requested as part of the vocabulary but each letter or number uses a single track.
- Words could be ordered in languages other than English.

=== I/O lines ===
Part of the machine order included the number of carrier lines:

- By default the IBM 7770 has the hardware to connect 4 carrier lines.
- Additional lines are added in increments of 4 up to a maximum of 48.
- When more than 16 lines are ordered then another frame has to be added to house them.

=== Control panels ===
There are two control panels:

- An operator panel containing lights, keys, and switches to control and monitor the operation of the 7770. Each I/O line has indicators and an output jack associated with it, allowing the operator to monitor an inquiry and the subsequent response.
- A CE (Customer Engineer) panel that allows the CE to manually set up and enter an inquiry, address vocabulary words, and listen to the response using earphones and an output jack. The CE panel supports both off-line tests (where all I/O lines are disabled and the 7770's operation is interrupted) and on-line tests on individual I/O lines.

=== Programming ===
The programming model differs between the two original models:

- The IBM 7770 Model 1 can be operated with the IBM 1311 File Input-Output Control System (IOCS) program or with customer supplied programs. If the customer uses the 1311 File IOCS, it issues a "get" command to retrieve inquiries from the 7770 and a "put" command to send the response. If the customer writes their own I/O program, any programming technique and any instruction applicable to the 1311 Model 2 may be used.
- The IBM 7770 Model 2 is controlled by what was called the Tele-Processing Supervisor (TPS). When the 7770 has an assembled inquiry, it sends an inquiry signal to the CPU which interrupts CPU operation. The TPS places the inquiry in core storage, determines the I/O line status, and sets a control field before exiting to the customer-written program for processing. After composing the response, the TPS assigns an address in the output message queue; when that address is reached, the response is sent to the audio output section.

=== Models ===
There are three models based on which IBM System the unit attaches to:

IBM 7770
Model	Announced	Withdrawn	Attachment
7770-1	Jan 24, 1964	Jan 16, 1968	IBM 1401, 1440, 1460 via IBM 1311 File Control Channel
7770-2	Jan 24, 1964	Jan 16, 1968	IBM 1410, 7010 via CPU Data Channel 1 or 2, using a 4659 or 4660 I/O Adapter
7770-3	April 7, 1964	August 16, 1982	System/360, System/370

The physical configuration is determined by the number of carrier lines:

IBM 7770
Number of lines	Frames	Length	Width	Height	Weight	Heat output/hr
4-16	1	37 1/2 in (95 cm)	31 1/2 in (80 cm)	70 in (180 cm)	600 lb (270 kg)	4,800 BTU (1,200 kcal)
20-48	2	73 1/2 in (187 cm)	31 1/2 in (80 cm)	70 in (180 cm)	1,200 lb (540 kg)	7,200 BTU (1,800 kcal)

=== Example users ===
A survey of companies using voice response units that measured satisfaction with the technology was run by Datapro in 1976. Out of 26 respondents, 11 reported they were using IBM units (although they did not define which models). Of those, 10 rated IBM as excellent and 1 rated the IBM equipment as good.

Some historical customers are as follows:

- The Manufacturers Bank of Detroit reported in 1965 that they were installing an IBM 7770 to allow tellers in their 64 branches to look up customer account details. They claimed it was one of the first installs in the United States. The project to install it was called Project MARS, which stood for 'Manufacturers Audio Response System".
- The Oakland Country Schools system began using the IBM 7770 in 1969 as a key part of what they claimed was the first fully computerised student attendance system in the United States. Every morning schools could report tardy or absent students by entering the school ID and then student IDs into a telephone using touch tones and coded cards.
- In 1973 Simpson-Sears in Toronto Canada ran a trial allowing 2000 select customers to place orders from a sales catalog using a 12 key touch-tone telephone. After entering their home phone number and street number, they could enter catalog numbers to place orders. Seers described it as an acceptable purchasing method using an emerging technology.
- In early 1971, International Harvester Corporation's Motor Truck Division in Fort Wayne, Indiana employed IBM 2721 terminals as part of a truck inventory system they called "Audre" (for audio response), that ran on two partitions of an IBM System/360 Model 65. Truck dealers used the 2721 to dial into Audre, authenticate using an assigned code number, and then receive a voice response from Audre's 128-word vocabulary. They used this to identify the location of any truck matching the desired combination of model, colour, and accessories, with the response being returned in seconds. This avoided the cost of a full-time leased terminal connection, since most dealers only needed to make two or three short calls per day.
- In Pugh, Johnston and Palmers history of the IBM S/360 and S370 they describe two use cases for an ARU (although they do not make clear if the ARUs were 7770s or 7772s):
  - The New York Stock Exchange used a combination of mark sense readers, an IBM 7750 programmed transmission control unit and an ARU to allow exchange workers to request stock price information by marking up a card which they then fed into a reader. They then had the last sale, current bid and current ask prices announced to them via the ARU.
  - Southwestern Bell Telephone Company installed two ARUs in 1965 along with a suite of other equipment to automatically handle callers who dialled out-of-date phone numbers, a task previously handled by human operators.

== IBM 7772 ==
The 7772 came with support for 2 I/O lines by default and these could be increased to 4, 6 or 8. The vocabulary was stored in a random access disk device in a digitally coded form. Several thousand words in multiple languages could be stored and replayed using the vocoder technique. By default the 7772 came with a 1000 word vocabulary in American English. The IBM 7772 was developed by the IBM Lab in La Gaude, France and manufactured by IBM in Kingston New York.

The 7772 is mentioned in online documents as early as 1964 and is listed as withdrawn in the 1979 IBM Sales Manual. It does not appear in any online copy of an IBM Manual after 1977.

IBM 7772
Model	Announced	Withdrawn	Attachment	Length	Width	Height	Weight	Heat output/hr
7772-3	Approximately 1964	During or after 1977	S/360 & S/370	37 1/2 in (95 cm)	31 1/2 in (80 cm)	70 in (180 cm)	600 lb (270 kg)	5,100 BTU (1,300 kcal)

=== Example users ===
- In 1968 Westinghouse reported they were using an IBM 7772 as part of a system they called Westar (Westinghouse Telephone Aperture Retrieval). An engineer could request an engineering drawing by dialling into the 7772, entering the desired document number as well as pertinent information like their department code, telephone number and employee number. They would then be verbally given the result which was either "message accepted" (meaning the order had been placed), or an informative message such as "this is a restricted drawing" or "there is no record of this document".
- The University of Michigan used an IBM 7772 to teach a totally blind man to use Fortran and the MTS operating system using just a touch telephone and a loudspeaker. They also developed a way to speed up the audio output (eliminating user frustration with the speed of the spoken output) and a software package for MTS that increased the vocabulary of the IBM 7772.
- In 1972 Wayne State University reported they were using an IBM 7772 to allow students to order hard copy printouts. They entered their order using a touch tone telephone and the IBM 7772 would read their order number out to them. They could then collect their printout from the DP Center.

== IBM 1001 Data Transmission Terminal ==
The IBM 1001 Data Transmission terminal allows a user to dial into an Audio Response Unit and send characters entered either with a 10 digit keyboard or from the first 22 columns of a punched card. It transmits 12 characters per second. The user has to establish the connection by dialling on the attached telephone.

It was announced on July 18, 1960 and withdrawn on January 30, 1980. It was originally launched to transmit data to a remote IBM 24 or IBM 26 Card Punch.

== IBM 2721 Portable Audio Terminal ==
The IBM 2721 Portable Audio Terminal is a battery-powered portable terminal announced by IBM's Data Processing Division on January 26, 1970. It has an alphanumeric keypad with 60 keys. It allows a user to connect to an IBM System/360 using a standard telephone (including a phone booth) with an acoustic coupler, enter commands using a keypad and receiving vocalised output from a connected IBM Audio Response Unit. IBM positioned the 2721 as a flexible, portable terminal suited both to in-plant use and off-site field applications such as a mobile sales force. It sold for $600 USD or could be leased for $20 per month.
