= IBM microfilm products =

Microfilm equipment manufactured and sold by IBM in the 1960s

IBM Microfilm products
- Introduced: April 1963
- Discontinued: August 1969

IBM manufactured and sold microfilm products from 1963 till 1969. It is an example of IBM attempting to enter an established market on the basis of a significant technical breakthrough.

== Background ==
In the mid 1960s IBM Supply Division was producing billions of punched cards annually across six plants. However they relied on other divisions within IBM to manufacture the equipment that consumed those punched cards. An aperture card is a special type of punched card with a cut out window into which a chip of microfilm is mounted. The card is punched with machine readable metadata associated with what is on the microfilm image. A common use for these cards was engineering drawings. Because no division within IBM was selling equipment that developed or copied microfilm aperture cards, IBM Supply Division chose to make this equipment themselves. This was the first time they manufactured equipment to promote the sale of supplies.

== Announcements ==
On April 29, 1963, IBM Supplies Division began offering what they called their Micro-Processing System, with two desktop microfilm copiers called the IBM Micro-Copier I and IBM Micro-Copier II and a microfilm viewer called the IBM Micro-Viewer. On December 4, 1964, they then announced an additional set of microfilm products, aimed at combining the space saving capability of microfilm with punched cards developed using a new style of diazo process. The diazo process is a photographic process that produces images by exposing diazonium salts to ultraviolet light, then developing the image using ammonia fumes. Diazo films were considered ideal for duplicating things like master files of engineering drawings and other records. IBM claimed that in the microfilm industry that their diazo copiers were unique.

== Product innovations ==
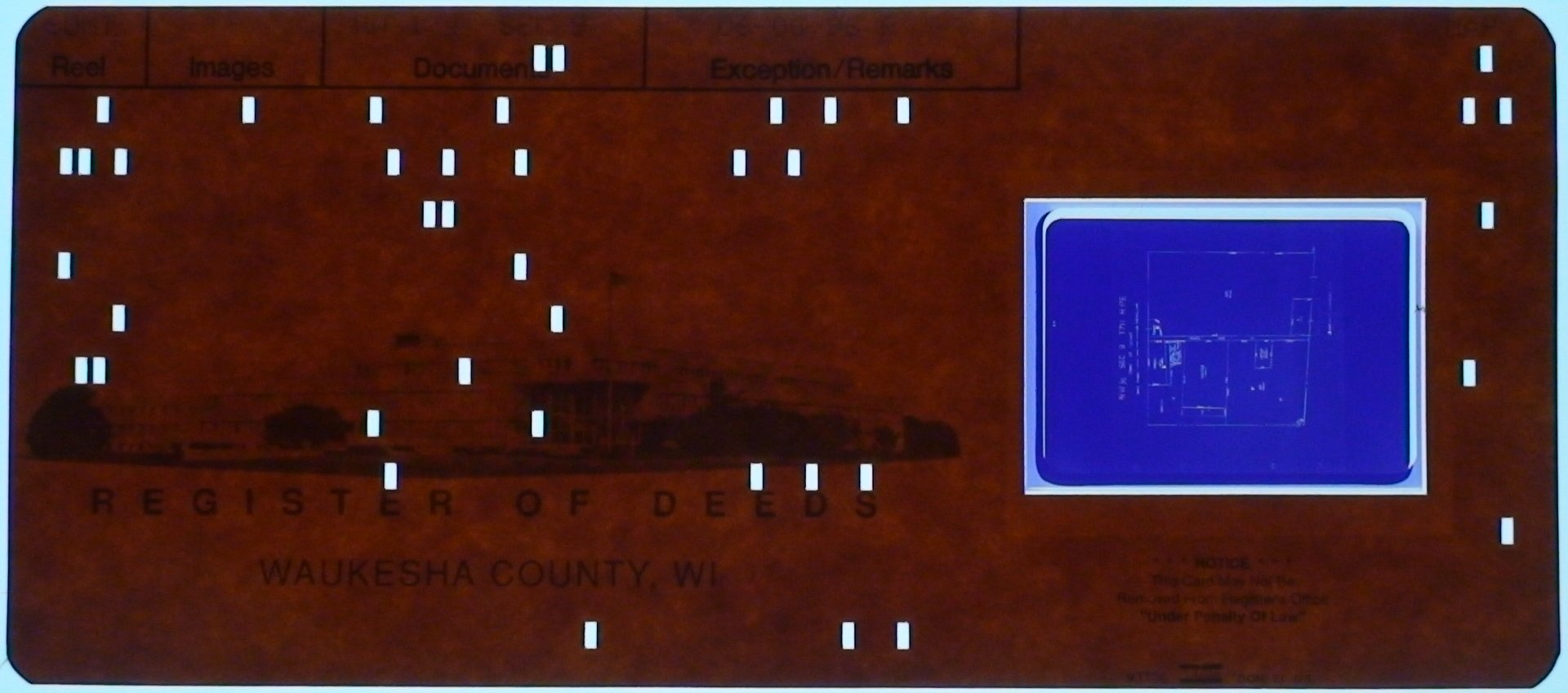
Example aperture card

In the early 1960s IBM San Jose was experimenting with photo image conversion, when they identified the need for a fast method of developing Diazo photo-materials. Existing commercial film solutions did not cater for direct development of film chips and aperture cards, while existing aperture card developers were too slow and suffered from ammonia leakage and/or required careful temperature and humidity controls to obtain uniform results.

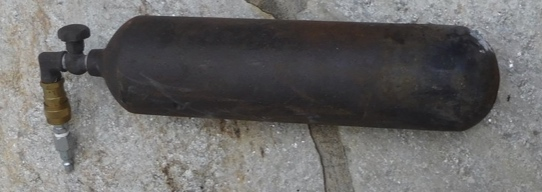
IBM Ammonia Bottle

They developed a high speed development process that they claimed significantly increased the speed of developing diazo photo-materials using pressurised anhydrous (dry) ammonia gas rather than an aqueous (wet) ammonia solution. It could operate at room temperature and thus did not need to use the high temperatures to release the ammonia fumes that conventional solutions used. They claimed it was 100 times faster than the conventional process and created more uniform output. A major innovation was the development of a platen and wash type developer that was designed to prevent the escape of ammonia gas (which had both an unpleasant odour as well as being corrosive). A residual ammonia absorber containing citric acid powder, bromothymole blue indicator and water was invented by IBM to absorb the vented ammonia.

In 1964 they filed a patent for their diazo development process and in 1965 they filed for their wash ammonia development device, both granted in 1968.

== Development and manufacturing locations ==
IBM Vestal initiated product development based on prototyping work done by IBM San Jose. This effort led to the IBM 9950 and IBM 9954. IBM Endicott Development Laboratory developed the IBM 9955. IBM Supplies Division (which was renamed the IBM Information Records Division in March 1966) initially manufactured the equipment in Vestal NY and then in Dayton NJ. They began shipping the new diazo copiers in January 1966.

== Microfilm products ==
The line of products included the following:

=== Aperture Cards ===
IBM Aperture Cards with thermal or diazo film cost $35 for 1,000 cards (in 1963).

=== Thermal Copiers ===
These developed using a dry thermal process (heat and ultraviolet-light) eliminating the need for chemicals that produced fumes that needed to be vented.

- IBM Micro-Copier I
  - $825 list price
  - Announced April 29, 1963
  - Compact desktop console Unit
  - Could copy aperture card to aperture card
  - Average 15 seconds per copy
- IBM Micro-Copier II
  - $925 list price
  - Announced April 29, 1963. Planned availability Q1, 1964
  - Could copy 16mm or 35mm silver halide roll film to aperture card.
  - Could copy aperture card to aperture card
- 9948: Thermal Copier

=== Diazo Copiers. ===
The diazo film copiers could in one step create copies from rolled microfilm to aperture cards or as well as from aperture card to aperture card. IBM claimed they were unique in their price range.

- IBM 9950: Diazo Copier
- IBM 9954: Diazo Copier
- IBM 9955: Micro-Copier Reproducer
  - $65000 USD list price. $1000 monthly rental.
  - Based on its speed and development process, IBM claimed this product was: "unique in the microfilm industry"
  - Announced December 4, 1964
  - Accepts Aperture Cards
  - Could produce up to 2100 developed aperture cards per hour
  - Combined imaging, punching and punch verification
  - Could accept images produced on silver, diazo or kalvar film
  - Produced diazo copies.
  - Could produce up to 99 copies in a single pass, the quantity controlled by a dial, or from punches on the master card
- IBM 9965: Diazo Copier
  - IBM claimed this was:
    The only diazo film copier in its price range that in one step copied images from roll microfilm to punched cards as well as from card to card.
  - Announced December 4, 1964
  - Console desktop unit
  - Could copy 16mm or 35mm roll film to aperture card
  - Could copy aperture card to aperture card
  - Could output on average eight cards per minute
  - Had an 8 in × 10 in (20 cm × 25 cm) viewing screen to align and verify roll film
  - The viewer could magnify 12x

=== Cameras ===
- IBM 9951: Camera
- IBM 9956: Camera.
  - 35mm Camera that used Kodak silver halide Type I Class I film
  - Announced December 4, 1964

=== Microfilm Viewers ===
Microfilm viewers allowed operators to view microfilm and depending on model, print from microfilm.

- IBM 9921 Document Viewer Model I
  - $300 USD list price
  - 18 1/2 in × 18 in × 25 in (47 cm × 46 cm × 64 cm) in size
  - 14 in × 15 in (36 cm × 38 cm) view screen
  - Capable of 16:1, 24:1, 30:1, 38:1 magnification
  - Accepts fiche in or out of jackets (plastic see through pockets), or aperture cards
  - Quartz iodide lamp with 2000 hour life
- IBM 9922 Document Viewer Model II
  - $400 USD list price
  - 18 1/2 in × 23 in × 25 in (47 cm × 58 cm × 64 cm) in size
  - 14 in × 22 in (36 cm × 56 cm) view screen
  - Could display two adjacent documents
  - Capable of 16:1, 24:1, 30:1 magnification
  - Accepts fiche, jackets or aperture cards
  - Quartz iodide lamp with 2000 hour life
- IBM 9949 Micro-Viewer
  - $216 USD list price
  - Announced April 29, 1963
  - 13 in × 10 in × 15 in (33 cm × 25 cm × 38 cm) in size
  - 8 in × 10 in (20 cm × 25 cm) view screen
  - Capable of 6.5:1, 7:1, 15:1, 20:1 magnification
  - Accepts aperture cards or 16mm or 35mm roll film
- IBM 9952: Standard Micro-Viewer-Printer
  - $3000 USD list price
  - Announced December 4, 1964
  - 36 in × 47 in × 51 1/2 in (91 cm × 119 cm × 131 cm) in size
  - 18 in × 24 in (46 cm × 61 cm) view screen
  - Capable of 15:1 magnification
  - Capable of producing high contrast paper prints 18 in × 24 in (46 cm × 61 cm) max
  - Accepts aperture cards or 16mm or 35mm roll film
- IBM 9953: Viewer-Printer Stacker Module

== Example customers ==
Mack Trucks claimed to have installed the first complete IBM Micro-Processing System in the USA. They used the system to store and distribute engineering diagrams. They claimed the system eliminated a major bottleneck that occurred after an engineering drawing change was made. By being able to microfilm and copy new documents they were able to remove outdated diagrams and share new ones much faster. They used two IBM Cameras, three diazo copiers, seven thermal copiers, 7 viewer-printers and 49 desktop viewers along with punched card equipment.

Avco Lycoming used IBM Microfilm products to reduce the volume of documents needed in jet aircraft manufacturing. Each jet engine could involve up to 50,000 technical documents and the use of full size copies represented a storage and delivery challenge. They instead used aperture cards created using an IBM 9956 camera and then copied by an IBM 9955 Micro-copier. Throughout each plant they used IBM 9922 and 9949 viewers to view the files.

Purolator Products Inc used the IBM Micro-Processing System to manage 140,000 drawings need by draftsmen and engineers. They used an IBM camera that they described as a 35mm Planetary Microcamera Model 1088 MXUL that took a 100-foot roll of 35mm silver halide film and which could create 540 frames. After processing the film, they used two IBM Diazo Copiers Model II D and one IBM 9948 Thermal Copier. They also used an IBM 519 Reproducing punch to transfer data from work cards to aperture cards as well as an IBM 557 interpreter to print identifying information. Draftsmen and Engineers would then use a diazo copier to copy an aperture card from their reference library and then view it on the viewer and/or then print it.

Nassua County converted 11,000 large volumes of land deeds to microfilm, freeing up 12,000 square feet of office space. As files were converted, a duplicate was stored separately. They then viewed the deeds using an IBM 9922 Viewer.

== Withdrawal of IBM Micro-Processing products ==
IBM announced they were withdrawing their Micro-Processing equipment in August 1969. In January 1970 Keuffel & Esser of Morristown NJ announced they were negotiating with IBM to acquire their microfilm assets such as the diazo and thermal copiers, microfilm viewers and supplies. The sale was completed in April 1970.

Despite IBM withdrawing from the market, some equipment remained in use well into the 1980s. For instance Hyster were still actively using an IBM 9955 as part of their engineering drawing management for their manufacturing process in 1982, while Bruning EMS of Dayton Ohio were advertising that they were still using IBM 9955 duplicators in 1986.

== Computer Output Microfilm (COM) ==
IBM never produced a commercial computer printer that produced microfilm output such as the Stromberg Datagraphix Model 4360. During the 1950s and the 1960s they made two significant attempts:

- In the late 1950s IBM Endicott developed a CRT based microfilm printer that used a tube made by RCA called a Compositron, but it was not launched, partly because it still used vacuum tubes at a time when IBM was converting to transistors. IBM then began working with Stromberg-Carlson who were developing a microfilm printer that used a tube called a Charactron tube, but this relationship did not proceed to market. IBM eventually shipped a single transistor based version of their own microfilm printer to the Social Security Administration in Baltimore. This was successfully used until no more compositron tubes could be located, at which time it was replaced by a Stromberg-Carlson printer.
- In the early 1960s IBM San Jose developed the IBM 1360 Photo-Digital Storage System. This used silver-halide film rather than diazo developed microfilm. It was also unsuccessful.

== Other IBM products that used microfilm ==
Even though IBM withdrew from the microfilm reader and copier market in 1969, they did subsequently offer at least two other products that used microfilm. These were document reader/sorters that microfilmed the front and back of checks for regulatory purposes:

- IBM 3890 Document Processor, sold by IBM from 1973 to 2005 offers an optional microfilming module.
- IBM 3694 Document processor, sold by IBM from 1980 to 1990 offers an optional microfilming module.
