= IBM Check Processing Control System =

Check sorting software

CPCS
- Developer: IBM
- Initial release: before 1971; 54 years ago
- Stable release: V1R13 / 2006; 19 years ago
- Written in: Cobol, Assembler
- Operating system: z/OS
- Type: Check Sorting Software
- License: Proprietary
- Website: www.ibm.com/Products/CPCS at the Wayback Machine (archived May 24, 2001)

CPCS (Check Processing Control System) is an IBM software product that supports high-speed check sorting within financial institutions. The software works in conjunction with check-sorting equipment, such as the IBM 3890.

IBM began development of CPCS in or before 1971. It was scheduled to be available in October 1972, although the IBM System/360 and System/370 Bibliography shows CPCS documentation as newly added in the August 1972 edition. The goal was to create a database of all MICR entries and handle pass control. It was designed to work with OS/360 in 256KB of core storage. It was IBM Product 5734-F11.

CPCS is run on IBM System/360 and later IBM mainframe computers and receives the data from the document processor and can store information from the cheques, including the bank number, branch number, account number and the amount the check was written for, as well as internal transaction codes.

IBM withdrew CPCS from marketing on Nov 29, 2021.

== See also ==
- z/OS
