= IBM document processors =

Check processing devices from IBM

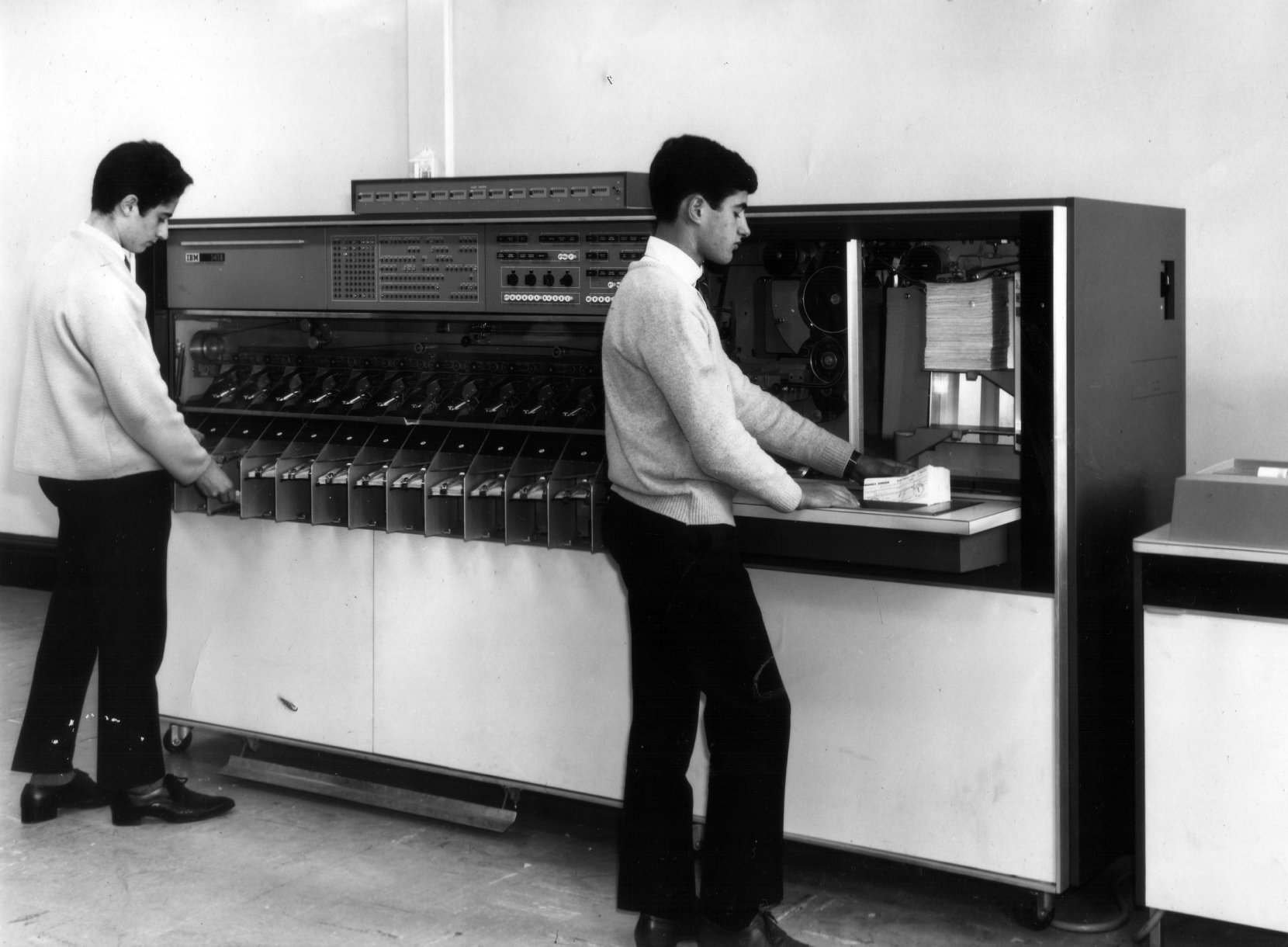
- Introduced: 1934
- Discontinued: 2005

IBM manufactured and sold document processing equipment such as proof machines, inscribers and document reader/sorters for financial institutions from 1934 to 2005.

== IBM and document processing ==
Prior to the introduction of computers, cheque processing was performed manually by each institution. IBM recognised the opportunity to automate this processing and began building machines for this purpose, starting with the IBM 801 Bank Proof machine in 1934. By eliminating hand written ledgers, the IBM 801 automated teller operations.

By the mid 1950s many banks began investigating the use of new technology to handle the ever growing volume of cheques that needed to be processed each day. As an example, Bank of America's checking accounts were growing at a rate of 23,000 per month and branches were forced to close their doors by 2 p.m. to finish the daily postings. In the United Kingdom, wages began to be paid by cheque. The number of cheques cleared by the central clearing house had grown from around 250 million in 1938 to around 320 million in 1951 and reached over 500 million by 1964.

A number of technologies were developed by companies like EMI in the UK (Figure Reading Electronic Device or FRED), and Compagnie des Machines Bull in France (CMC-7) to make cheques machine-readable by means of pre-printed characters or characters that were inscribed on the cheque when it was being proofed at the branch. IBM Poughkeepsie lab under J.A. Weidenhammer meanwhile was working on equipment that could mechanically feed, transport and stack paper checks, as these could not be handled by the existing techniques used for punched cards. They created a system of friction wheels and belts to achieve this. Meanwhile, another group within IBM collaborated with Weidenhammer on developing a machine-readable magnetic ink barcode, printed below human readable numerals, which they demonstrated to Barclays Bank in 1957. But after much industry consultation, the E-13B MICR font developed by General Electric as part of a solution sold to Bank to America became the American standard adopted by the ABA in 1958. The ABA had previously concluded that IBM's proposed marking system would be too costly and also, that it was visually unattractive. After some hesitation, IBM developed their own multi-track read head for MICR characters and switched to using E-13B. In 1959 they began promoting the IBM 1210. IBM Supplies Division (which also manufactured punched cards) also saw an opportunity to sell paper checks, printed by IBM in an IBM plant.

IBM's main competitors in 1959 were Burroughs with their B101 Reader/Sorter, which could sort 1560 documents per minute, sold as part of their B251 Visible Record Computer System, and NCR, which sold a sorter jointly developed with Pitney-Bowes that also used components supplied by General Electric.

By 1963 the American National Standards Institute (ANSI) adopted the ABA specifications as the American standard, along with countries like the UK, Canada and Australia. Meanwhile, CMC-7 was adopted as the French standard in 1964 and grew to be widely used in Europe and South America.

Adoption of these sorters was usually linked to adoption of the computer system it attached to, although the first 1210 rented by Barclays Bank in 1960 was used purely in an offline capacity before the bank bought an IBM 1419 attached to an IBM 1401 in 1963. New procedures and standards were also adopted, for instance Martins Bank in the UK took delivery of an IBM 1412 on 22 October 1961, but it was not fully operational till April 1963.

Document processing usually involved the following process. First, documents to be proofed would be loaded into the hopper of a proof machine and then fed through the machine one at a time. For each document:

- The document would be read: The operator would read the value of each document and key that value into the machine. The machine would keep a running total of amounts and usually print that out.
- The document would be inscribed: inscribing was the process of printing the value of the document onto the document, so it could be read back electronically, by either the proof machine or a reader/sorter.
- The document would be endorsed: endorsing was the processing of stamping the document, either on the front or the back or both.
- The document would be sorted: proof machines could sort the document into pockets.

As an example the IBM 4723 order of operations was described as follows:

Hopper --> View --> Slot --> Read -> Stamp front (endorse) -->. Audit trail print --> Inscribe -->. Stamp back (endorse) -->. Sort (into 1 of 3 pockets)

After proofing the documents would be sent to a reader/sorter for data capture and final sorting. The sorter might endorse the document as well as print a sequence number onto it. The sorter might also microfilm the document, while later sorters used document imaging technology.

== Proofing machines and inscribers ==
=== IBM 801 ===
Announced by IBM in 1934, the IBM 801 could list and separate checks, endorse them and record totals. It was withdrawn on Jan 18, 1956. The 801 is unrelated to the later IBM 801 processor.

=== IBM 802 ===
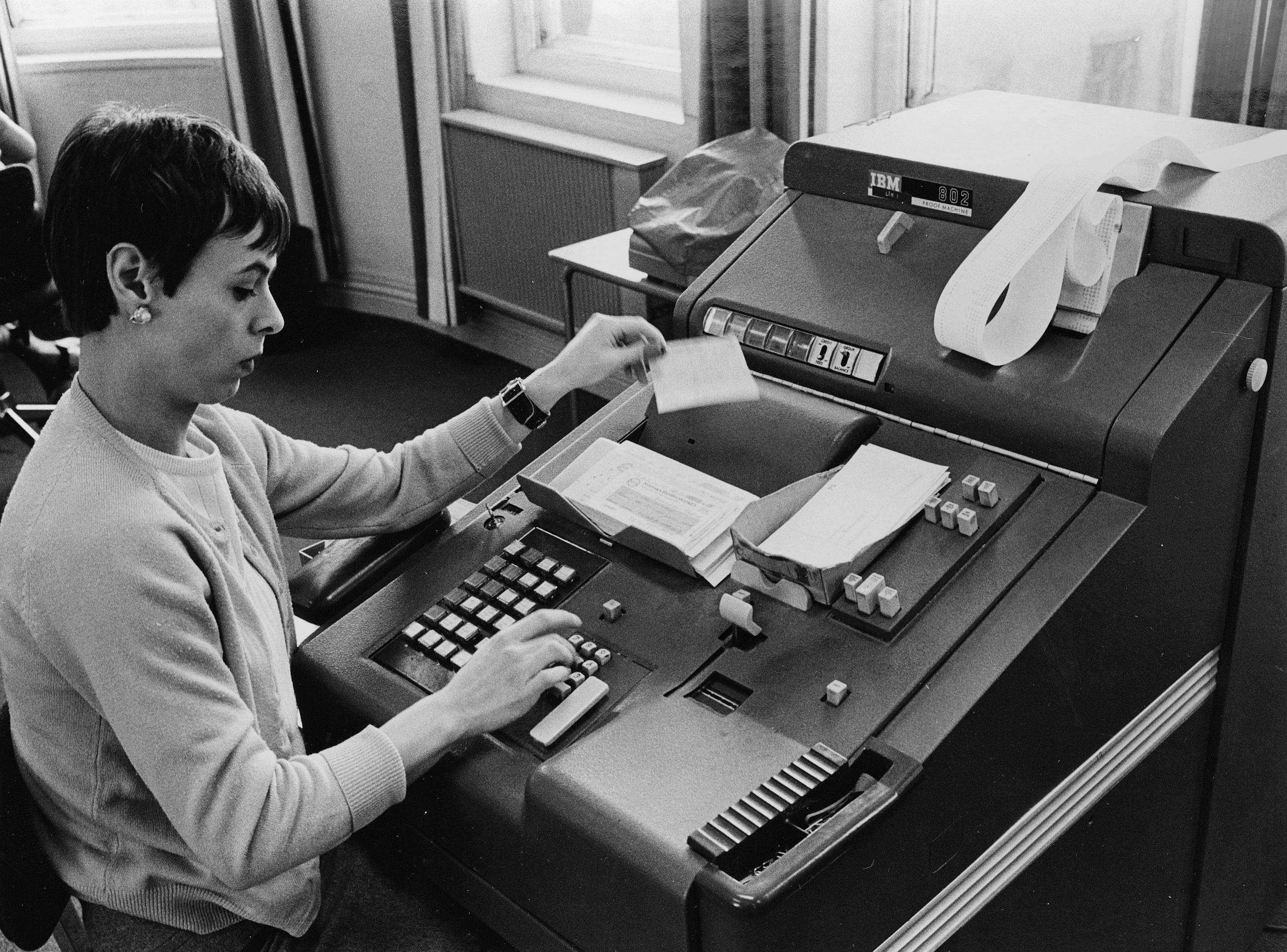
IBM 802 Proof Machines in Postbanken (4)

Announced by IBM in July 1949, the IBM 802 is a proofing machine that could sort, list, prove and endorse checks and sort them into 24 pockets. It was withdrawn on June 28, 1965.

=== IBM 803 ===
Announced by IBM in July 1949, the IBM 803 is a proofing machine that could sort, list, prove and endorse checks and sort them into 32 pockets. This machine remained in the IBM Sales Manual till Dec 18, 1981.

=== IBM 1201 ===
The IBM 1201 is a proof inscriber, that could perform all the functions of an IBM 803 (which it closely resembled) as well as document inscribing. It has 10 models offering a variety of options including up to 32 pockets plus document endorsing as an optional feature. IBM Rochester began shipping the IBM 1201 in August 1961. In 1963 IBM Supplies introduced a new endorsing roll for the IBM 1201 which can provide for up to 375,000 endorsements. It was withdrawn on Nov 22, 1978.

=== IBM 1202 ===
The IBM 1202 Utility Inscriber is a specially designed electric type-writer that is used to inscribe documents prior to them being sorted. It was announced Jan 12, 1959 and withdrawn April 26, 1966.

=== IBM 1203 ===
The IBM 1203 is a unit inscriber that can print numerals and special symbols on documents using magnetic ink. It is also an adding machine. It was manufactured by IBM Rochester. It was announced Mar 8, 1961 and withdrawn Nov 22, 1978.

=== IBM 1206 ===
The IBM 1206 described either as a coder or encoder, was a CMC-7 inscriber. The Belgian GIRO Administration was using 26 of them in 1970, attached to Olympia adding machines.

=== IBM 1260 ===
The IBM 1260 Electronic Inscriber was a proofing machine with eight stackers. It could inscribe documents as well as optionally endorse them. Three or five external stackers could optionally be added. It was manufactured by IBM Rochester until September 1971, although it remained available for rental for many years afterwards.

It was approximately 3 ft × 6 ft × 3 ft (0.91 m × 1.83 m × 0.91 m).

It was announced on July 1, 1965, and withdrawn on December 18, 1981.

== Reader/Sorters ==
There are several families of IBM sorters. The IBM 1259 (which was an OEM) at 600 documents a minute. The smaller 1255/1270 running at between 500 and 750 documents per minute. The 1210, 1412, 1419 and 1275 moving from 900 to 1600 documents per minute. There were two midrange sorters, the 3892 and 3891, released in that order. Finally the IBM 3890 running at 2400 documents per minute.

=== IBM 1255 / IBM 1270 ===
The IBM 1255 is a MICR reader/sorter. The IBM 1270 is an OCR reader/sorter that uses the same sorter engine as the IBM 1255 but with more processing hardware. The CMC-7 models of the IBM 1255 as well as the IBM 1270 were not offered for sale in the United States.

The input hopper holds a 5-1/2" stack of documents that uses a gravity feed. Each stacker pocket can hold up to 2-1/2" of documents.

Two offline sort patterns are possible but with a 6 stacker sorter, it is typical to sort in two phases. Phase one sorts on the even digits of one field (using five stackers) with odd digits going to the reject stacker (the top stacker). Phase two sorts on the odd digits of one field (using five stackers). The operator can leave the documents from phase one in the stackers when starting phase two. If a 12 stacker sorter is in use then sorting can be done in a single phase using ten stackers, with the remaining two stackers being used for rejects (using the top stacker of the first bay known as stacker R) and special sorts (using the top stacker of the second bay known as stacker A).

The 1255 and 1270 can be attached to an IBM System/3, IBM System/32, IBM System/34, or IBM System/36 using a serial I/O channel adapter. They can also be attached to a System/360 or System/370 parallel channel.

==== IBM 1255 ====
There are six models, the differences being: maximum speed; stacker count and whether the sorter could read E-13B or CMC-7. Models 1, 2 and 3 are E-13B while models 21, 22 and 23 are CMC-7. Models 1, 2, 21 and 22 have 6 stacker pockets while Models 3 and 23 have 12.

==== IBM 1270 ====
There are four models. Models 1 and 3 have 6 stacker pockets while Models 2 and 4 have 12 stacker pockets. The machine is both longer and heavier than an IBM 1255. The majority of the hardware for the extra pockets in the Models 2 and 4 appears to already be present in Models 1 and 3.

IBM 1255 /IBM 1270
Model	MICR Type	Announced	Withdrawn	Documents per minute	Stacker pockets	Length	Width	Height	Weight	Heat output/hr
1255-1	E-13B	Oct 20, 1970	Oct 1, 1985	500	6	99 cm (39 in)	75 cm (30 in)	140 cm (55 in)	255 kg (562 lb)	2,600 BTU (660 kcal)
1255-2	E-13B	Oct 20, 1970	Oct 1, 1985	750	6	99 cm (39 in)	75 cm (30 in)	140 cm (55 in)	255 kg (562 lb)	2,600 BTU (660 kcal)
1255-3	E-13B	Oct 20, 1970	Nov 3, 1987	750	12	149 cm (59 in)	75 cm (30 in)	140 cm (55 in)	320 kg (710 lb)	2,600 BTU (660 kcal)
1255-21	CMC-7			500	6	99 cm (39 in)	75 cm (30 in)	140 cm (55 in)	255 kg (562 lb)	2,600 BTU (660 kcal)
1255-22	CMC-7			750	6	99 cm (39 in)	75 cm (30 in)	140 cm (55 in)	255 kg (562 lb)	2,600 BTU (660 kcal)
1255-23	CMC-7			750	12	149 cm (59 in)	75 cm (30 in)	140 cm (55 in)	320 kg (710 lb)	2,600 BTU (660 kcal)
1270-1/3	OCR				6	198 cm (78 in)	75 cm (30 in)	140 cm (55 in)	650 kg (1,430 lb)	8,000 BTU (2,000 kcal)
1270-2/4	OCR				12	198 cm (78 in)	75 cm (30 in)	140 cm (55 in)	650 kg (1,430 lb)	8,000 BTU (2,000 kcal)

=== IBM 1259 ===
Announced September 20, 1967 for use with the System/360 Models 20, 30 and 40. Read and sorted cheques at up to 600 cheques per minute into 11 pockets. It was withdrawn from marketing on July 16, 1973. It was manufactured for IBM by Lundy Electronics & Systems of Glen Head, New York. Deliveries began in third quarter of 1968.

Models included 1, 2, 3, 31, 33 and 34. Specifications below are for the Model 2.

IBM 1259
Announced	Withdrawn	Documents per minute	Stacker pockets	Length	Width	Height	Weight	Heat output/hr
September 20, 1967	July 16, 1973	600	11	78 in (200 cm)	29 1/4 in (74 cm)	61 5/8 in (157 cm)	1,250 lb (570 kg)	5,000 BTU (1,300 kcal)

=== IBM 1210 ===
Announced on January 1, 1959, it could read and sort E-13B cheques at up to 900 cheques per minute. An IBM 1210 Model 4 Sorter-Reader could be attached to an IBM 1401 The model 4 was withdrawn from marketing on September 16, 1960. Models 1, 2 and 3 were withdrawn on April 26, 1966. The Service Bureau Corporation offered document sorting as a service using the IBM 1210 reader/sorter in 1961. The Pacific State Bank of Hawthorne, California used the service to sort 11,000 checks a day, sending them daily from their three branches, with SBC returning the sorted cheques the following morning.

=== IBM 1219 ===
The IBM 1219 was announced on August 24, 1961, the same day as the IBM 1419. It sorted magnetically printed or inscribed documents.

The IBM 1219 was withdrawn on Feb 2, 1971.

=== IBM 1275 Optical Reader Sorter ===
The IBM 1275 Recognition System is a check reader sorter that reads OCR fonts rather than MICR fonts. It uses the same sorting engine as the IBM 1419 (and the IBM 1218/1228), but with an additional module for character recognition processing. This was needed because with a transport speed of 6.7 meters per second it needed much faster recognition logic. It was developed by IBM Uithoorn, The Netherlands with support from IBM Rochester and IBM Endicott.

It uses a single vertical column of 82 photodiodes that detect the reflected light from two tungsten filament lamps. Of the 82 photodiodes, 72 cover a scan-band of 9.1mm to detect the OCR character line, with the five photodiodes above and below this used to detect cancellation stamps and irregularities. The light detection works almost in the infrared band. It uses an instrumentation system based on the one developed for the IBM 1975.

It can recognise the numbers and four special symbols from the OCR-A and OCR-B fonts.

IBM 1275
Model	Announced	Withdrawn	Documents per minute	Stacker pockets	Length	Width	Height	Weight	Heat output/hr
2 or 4				13	160 in (410 cm)	41 1/2 in (105 cm)	60 1/2 in (154 cm)	3,465 lb (1,572 kg)	17,000 BTU (4,300 kcal)

It ships as three frames:

2956-5 Frames
Frame	Function	Length	Weight
1	Control	48 1/2 in (123 cm)	660 lb (300 kg)
2	Stacker	71 1/2 in (182 cm)	1,805 lb (819 kg)
3	Feed	40 in (100 cm)	1,000 lb (450 kg)

=== IBM 1412 ===
The IBM 1412 can read up to 950 documents using the E-13B font each minute and sort them into 13 pockets. It is functionally similar to the later IBM 1419. One 1412 Magnetic Character Reader can be connected to an IBM 1401 through a 7080 Serial Input-Output Adapter. The feed hopper can hold a 12-inch stack of 600 to 1, 200 documents, while each pocket can hold a 4.5 inch stack of documents.

IBM 1412
Announced	Withdrawn	Documents per minute	Stacker pockets	Length	Width	Height	Weight	Heat output/hr
Sept 16, 1960	Feb 2, 1971	950	13	112 in (280 cm)	41 1/4 in (105 cm)	60 1/4 in (153 cm)	2,475 lb (1,123 kg)	6,300 BTU (1,600 kcal)

=== IBM 1419 ===
The IBM 1419 can read up to 1600 documents using the E-13B font each minute and sort them into 13 pockets IBM claimed it could process up to 96,000 documents per hour. The first delivery was in November 1962.

IBM 1419
Announced	Withdrawn	Documents per minute	Stacker pockets	Length	Width	Height	Weight	Heat output/hr
August 24, 1961	Oct 1, 1985	1600	13	112 in (280 cm)	41 1/2 in (105 cm)	60 1/4 in (153 cm)	2,675 lb (1,213 kg)	8,500 BTU (2,100 kcal)

In the photo below you can see the documents were added on the right hand side, with a pneumatic arm pushing them upwards to the picker assembly. The feed hopper could hold a 12-inch stack of 600 to 1, 200 documents. They were then sorted into one of thirteen pockets that could each hold a 4.5 inch stack of documents. There is a long foot operated pedal bar (close to the ground between the two operators) which could be used to pause feeding while the operator emptied a pocket or dealt with an issue.

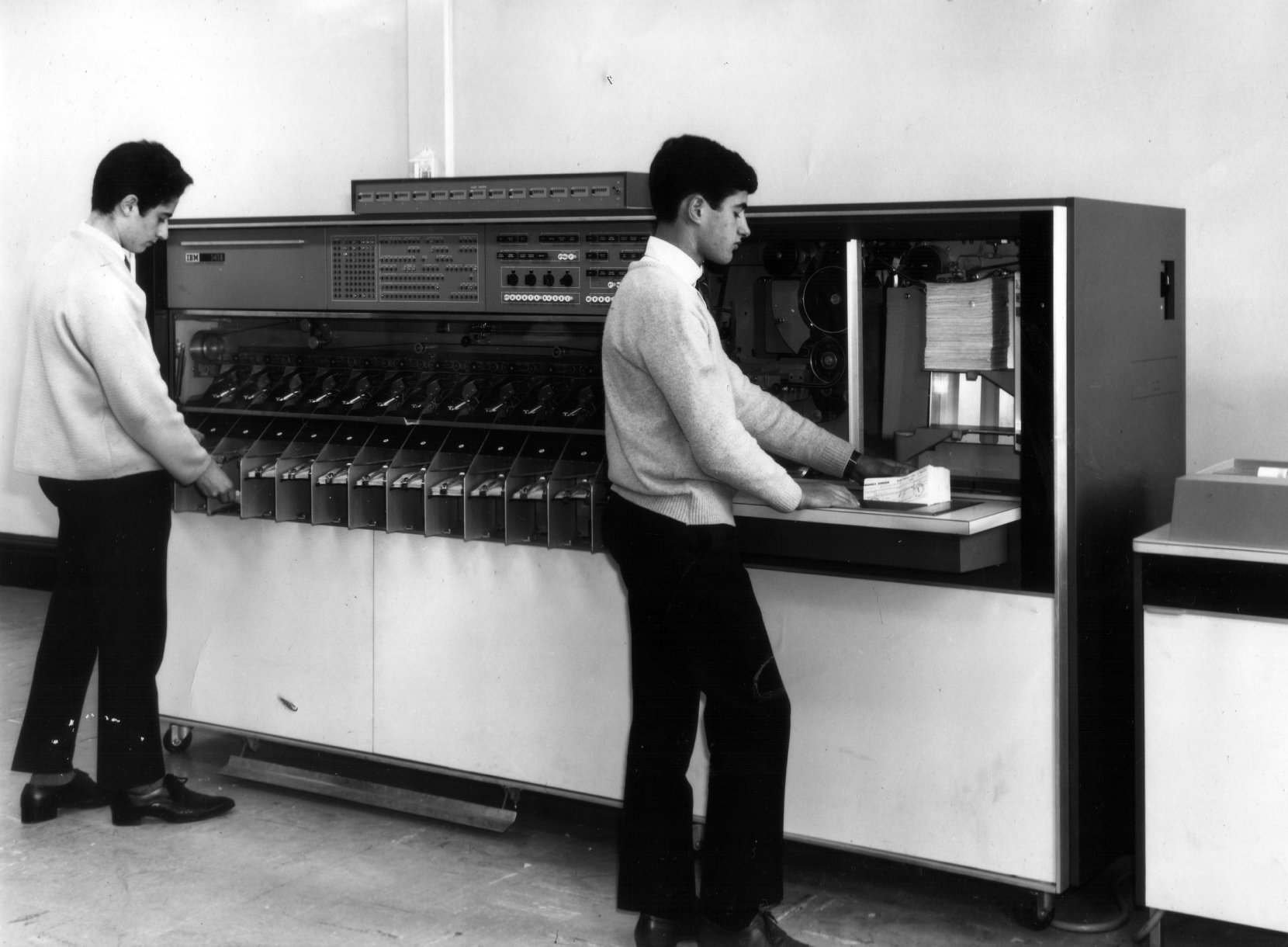

In 1970 it was reported that the Belgian GIRO Administration was using two 1419s that could read CMC-7 encoded documents.

=== IBM 2956 ===
The IBM 2956 Model 5 (2956-5) is a custom build multi-pocket reader sorter that was ordered by RPQ (Request for Price Quotation) W19976.

It physically resembles two IBM 1419 reader/sorters connected end to end. Only the right hand 1419 has a running board (used to hold trays of documents to be sorted) while the feed hopper of the left hand 1419 is covered by two doors. While it physically has 26 pockets, second hand resellers reported it as having 25.

The announcement and availability dates for the 2956-5 are not currently known, but the earliest available reference to the IBM 2956-5 (found so far), is January 1968. RPQ W19976 was withdrawn by IBM on March 9, 1981.

IBM 2956-5
Announced	Withdrawn	Length	Width	Height	Weight	Heat output/hr
	March 9, 1981	222 1/2 in (565 cm)	41 1/2 in (105 cm)	60 1/4 in (153 cm)	5,350 lb (2,430 kg)	21,500 BTU (5,400 kcal)

It ships as four frames:

2956-5 Frames
Frame	Length	Weight
1	72 in (180 cm)	1,645 lb (746 kg)
2	43 in (110 cm)	1,030 lb (470 kg)
3	71 1/2 in (182 cm)	1,645 lb (746 kg)
4	40 in (100 cm)	1,030 lb (470 kg)

Note that the IBM 2956 Model 2 and Model 3 are RPQ optical mark/hole readers which are totally different products. This can lead to confusion between these devices as they all share the same machine type.

Sorter operator updates information at the CPCS terminal on an IBM 3890 Document Processor

=== IBM 3890 ===
IBM introduced the 3890 High Speed Document Processor in June 1973 with shipments to begin in third quarter of 1974. It was developed at a time when the volume of checks in the USA that needed to be processed was booming. Russell F. Pound, Jr senior vice president at Connecticut’s Hartford National Bank was quoted as saying that 28 billion checks were written in the USA in 1974 and he expected that to rise to 46 billion by 1980. In a Think Magazine article in February 1978 he described why Hartford National had invested in three 3890 document processors to reduce float, the time it takes to return a check to the bank against which it is drawn and debit the associated account. He said that using the 3890 had moved the Bank from clearing 60% of checks in one day to 80%, which was beneficial as the quicker the check is cleared the more money the bank has on hand, strengthening its financial position. As another example, in a Think Magazine article in 1976 IBM stated that as a corporation they were writing 900,000 cheques per month.

It was developed by IBM Charlotte and manufactured by IBM Endicott. It is used by financial institutions to sort and tally all cheques, utility payment and gift certificates at the end of each banking day. The machine reads the magnetic ink characters (MICR) and/or the optical characters (OCR) that are encoded on the bottom of each document. This code line facilitates totalling the cheques and sorting them into pockets. The document process is designed to feed at a rate of 2400 six inch cheques per minute.

The 3890 had the following improvements over the 1419 and 2956-5:

- It was significantly faster, processing up to twice as many documents per hour (100,000 documents per machine per hour)
- Significantly more pockets (up to 36 versus 13 or 26)
- A significantly lower reject rate, up to half that seen previously, dropping as low as 1.3%
- An item numbering feature which printed a sequence number on each document
- Inbuilt jogger which virtually eliminated double feeds or piggybacks (two documents feeding together)

An application called Check Processing Control System (CPCS) is run on a main frame. It receives the data from the document processor and can store information from the cheques, including the bank number, branch number, account number and the amount the cheque was written for, as well as internal transaction codes. The 3890 can also operate in an offline mode using an SCI (Stacker Control Instruction) program.

The machine is made up of several modules, each performing specific task. At the far left of the machine is the control unit. Sort control programs, character recognition and host connection are handled by an IBM PC server in the control unit (3890/XP). Early A-F models used an IBM System/360 Model 25 processor with magnetic core memory. It links to all the electronic control systems and cabling that is required to operate the machine.

The next module is the left feed module. This section of the machine is where cheques are pulled into the transport path. The MICR line is magnetized and read in this part of the machine. The MICR information is passed to the control unit for additional processing. This module also has the ability to insert tracking documents into the stream of cheques in the transport. On Models A-F, the item numbering feature or INF was also found in the left feed module. The INF could print a unique 8 digit number on the back of each cheque.

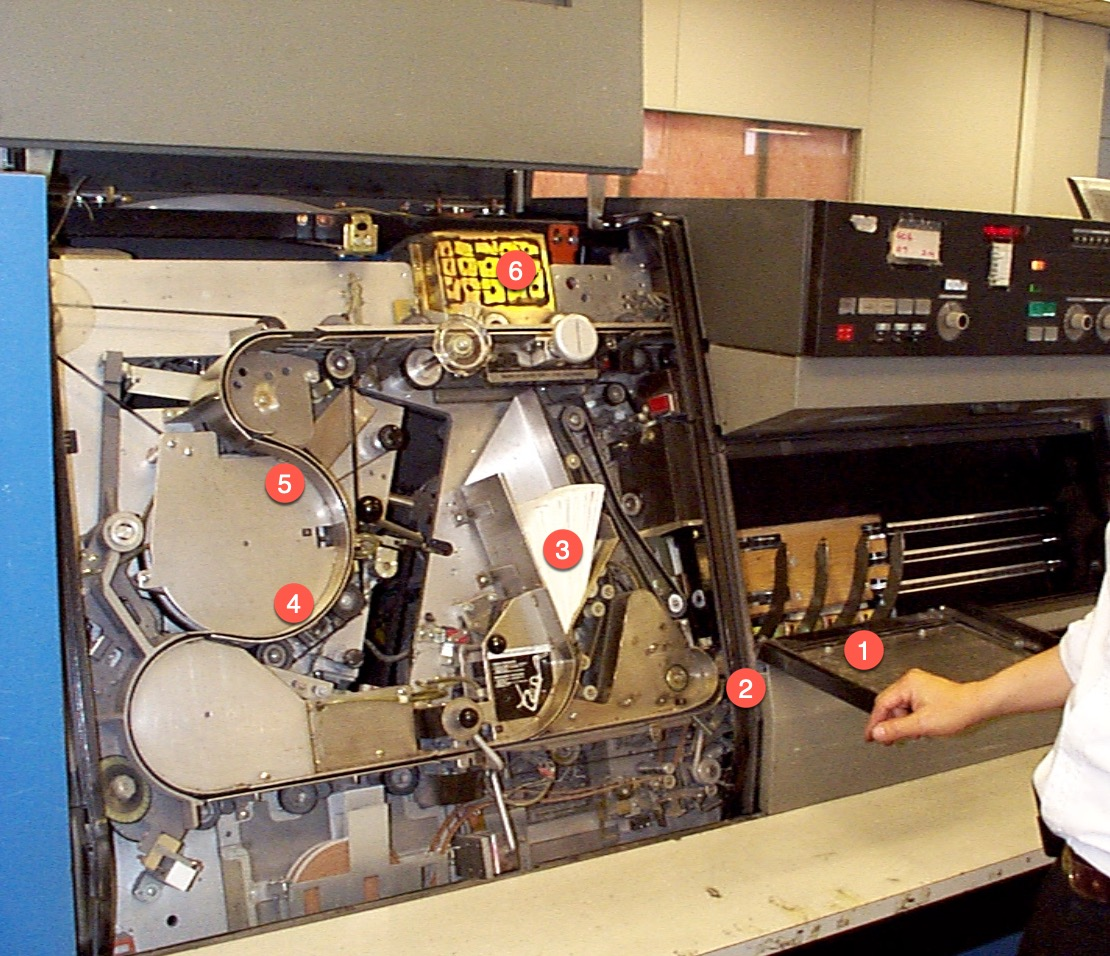
Front view of the left and right feed modules of an IBM 3890 Model B

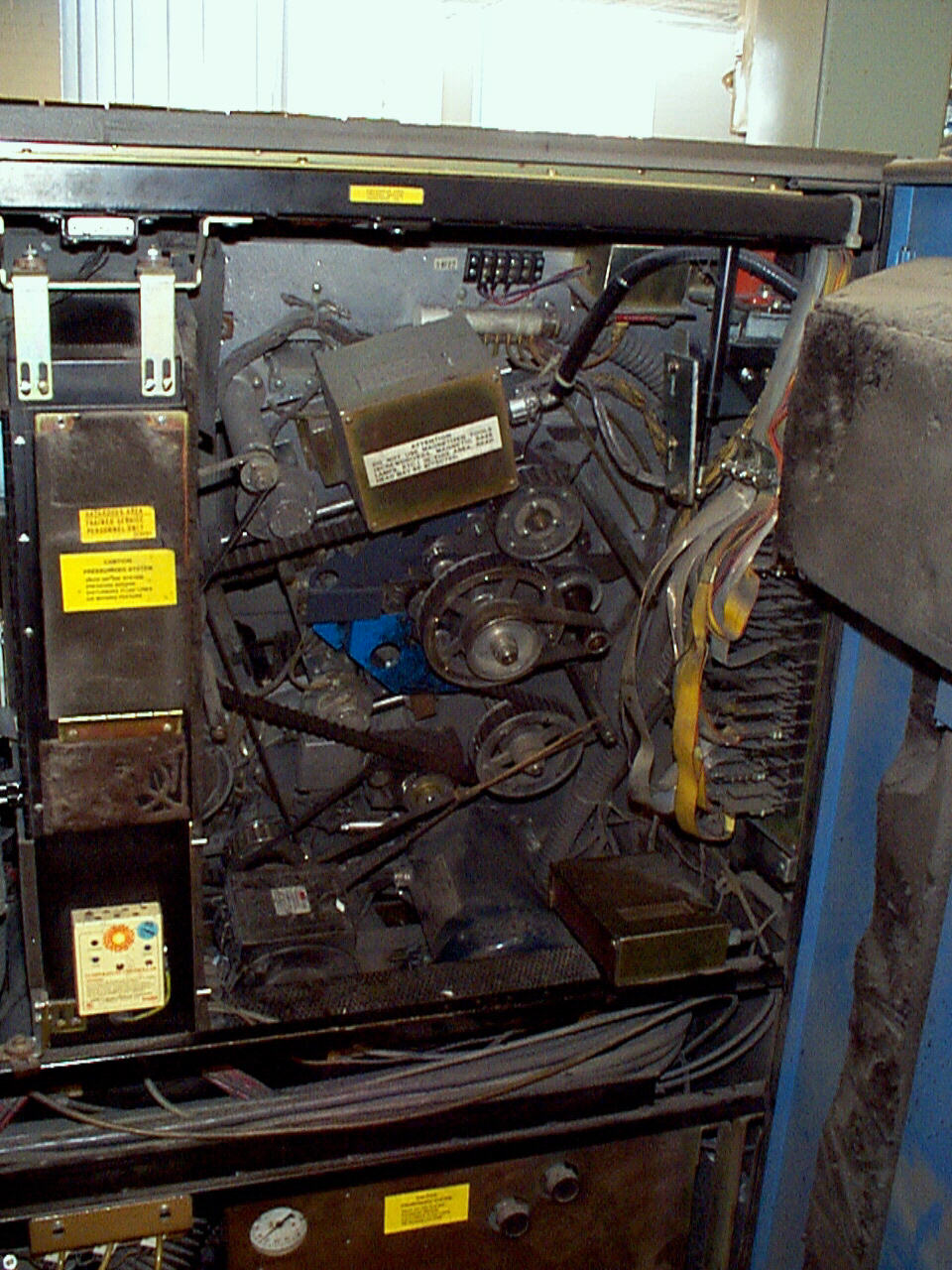
Rear view of the left feed module of an IBM 3890 Model B

In the front view image the following locations have been indicated.

1. This is the input hopper located in the right feed module. You can see four of the metal stabilising arms that rotated into position to hold the cheques upright as they moved over the wooden jogger plates. The wooden vertical jogger plate can be seen, although the horizontal plate cannot.
2. The input throat is located here. Cheques entered the transport path at this point. The documents would proceed horizontally from the right side of the module to the left side and then enter a double S-Bend on the left side of the module.
3. Separator documents could be loaded into this hopper and they would be fed into the document stream under software control to separate documents.
4. The write head is located here, which magnetised the MICR line
5. The read head is located here. This read the MICR line
6. The Item Numbering Feature or INF was located here. It printed a sequence number on the back of each cheque. In the model XP this was replaced by the PINE feature, located in the right feed module.

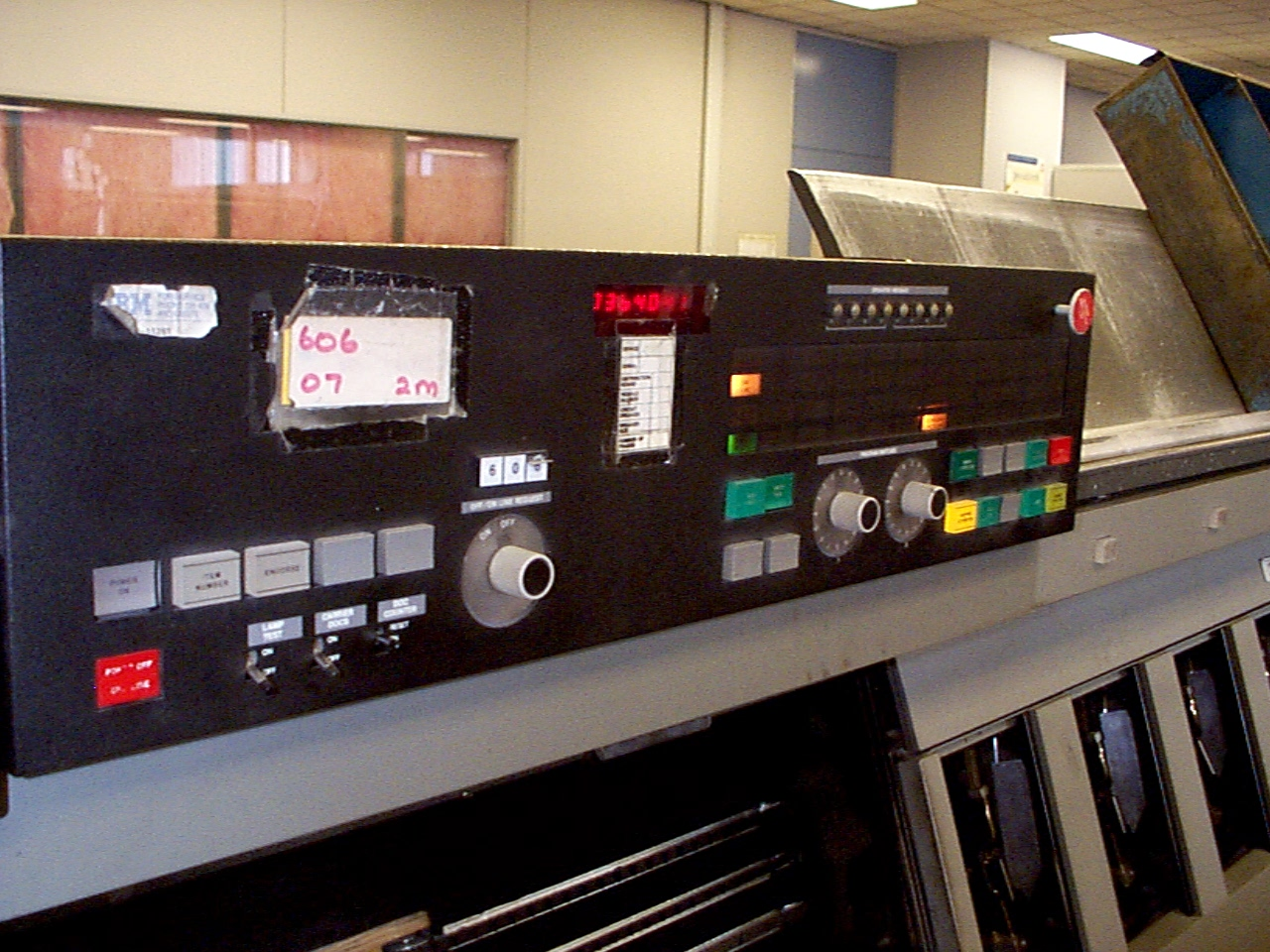
IBM 3890 Model B Right Feed module operator panel

The right feed module performs two functions. One is the input area, where up to 4800 cheques can be placed to be fed into the left module. Before this happens, all documents are “jogged” before they are moved into the transport. This process causes the cheques to be lined up better for feeding into the left feed module; institutions use an external jogger as well. The second function is the Programmable Endorsing and Item Numbering, which appeared with the model XP1. It is a high speed ink jet printer used to print document tracking number on each cheque which goes through the machine. At the same time an “endorsement” stamp is sprayed on to show which institution has handled the cheque. On Models A-F, an “endorsement” stamp is used to show what institution has handled the cheque.

After this, the document passes through two optional modules. To meet the requirements of the American Banking Association, one of the two must be used. Until October 2003, the only legal way to provide long term archiving of cheques was microfilm. This is one of the optional modules. High speed strobe lights illuminate the cheques and mirrors direct the lit image through a camera onto film. The front and back of the cheque, plus the item number are transferred to the film.

The other optional module is the Image Capture Processor (ICP). High speed digital scanners generate pictures of the front and back of the cheque. To keep up with the speed that documents move by the scanners, four PC's are used – one cheque directed to one PC, the next to the second and so forth. These images are consolidated to a fifth PC which sends the images to a host computer system, where the digital images can be stored on hard disks. After this they can be backed up using magnetic tapes for long term archiving. As of October, 2003, these images, rather than the physical cheques, can be used when institutions needs to exchange cheque information.

The final component on a 3890 is the stacker modules. Each module has six pockets, and the machine supports up to six stackers for a total of 36 pockets. The sort control program directs each document to the appropriate pocket. A cheque might be sorted according to the institution it is drawn against, a customer account, or a utility company. These pockets allow the physical cheques to be collected and stored in trays. Each pocket could hold between 800 and 1,000 documents. The operator could remove all but the last 200 to 300 documents without stopping the 3890. Each pocket had a warning light to tell the operator that the pocket was getting full, because once the pocket was full the sorter would stop. The first pocket in stacker one was the reject pocket, where rejected documents would be sorted.

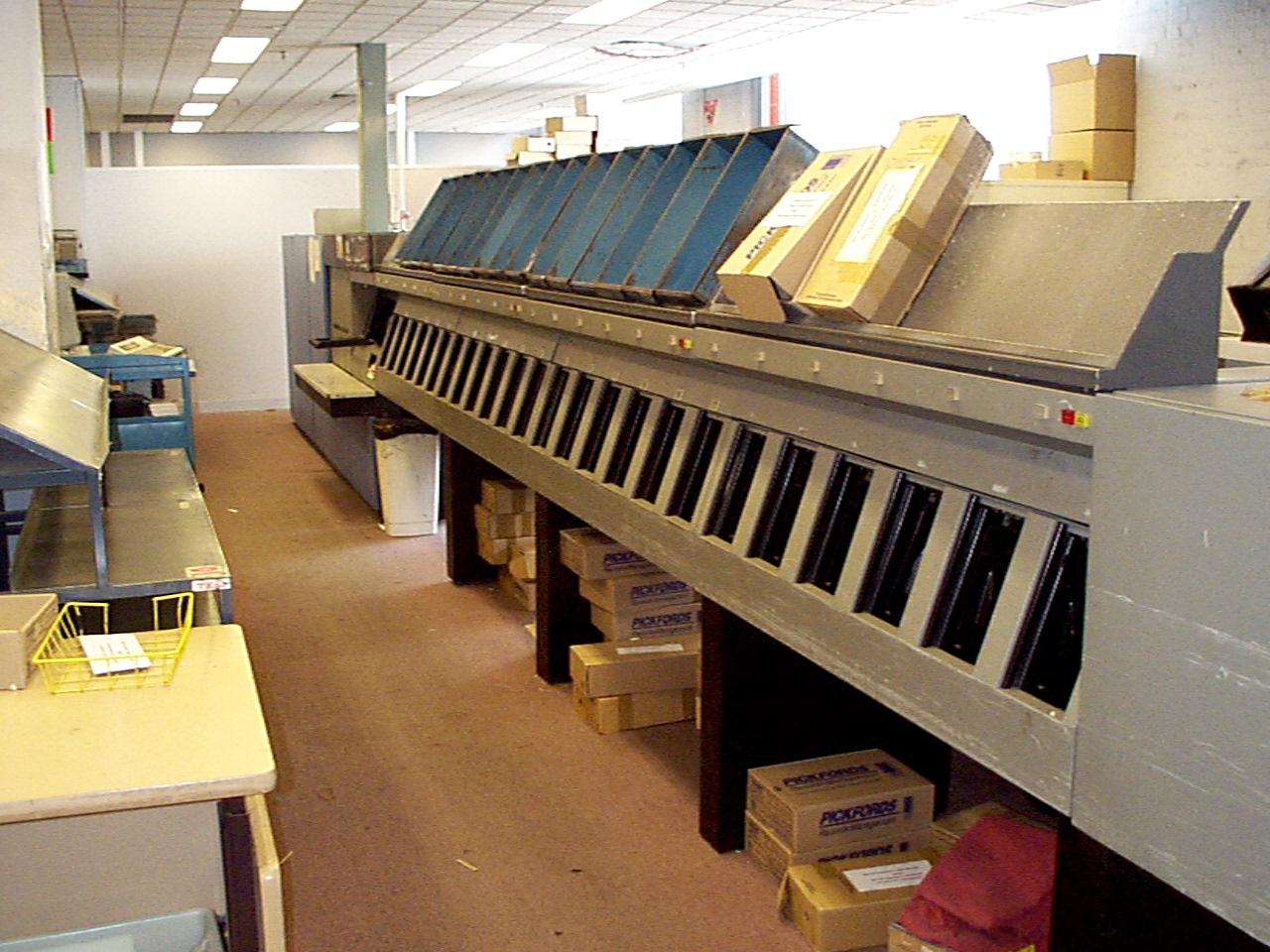
An IBM 3890 Model B04. It is an '04' because it has four stacker modules.

==== Programming ====
The 3890 is programmed by two methods. The first is SCI (Stacker Control Instructions), which are executed directly by the S/360 in the model A-F machines, and emulated by the PC in the 3890/XP. The 3890/XP added an additional method of programming, known as Native. This allowed programs written for the PC to make sort decisions. The API available to Native programs is the SPXSERV API.

==== 3890 Models ====
There were seven models of the 3890. Models A through F and the model XP1. For models A through F, the number of stacker modules was also part of the model, so a model A02 had two stacker modules (12 pockets) and a model B04 has four stacker modules(24 pockets).

The E/F Models were announced at the American Banking Association conference on June 13, 1982, in Los Angeles as a lower speed/lower volume sorter for medium-sized financial institutions. The new models ran at 70% of the speed of the A/B models with first shipments planned for first quarter of 1983.

For the XP1, the stacker count was indicated by feature codes 3022. By default an XP1 shipped with two stacker modules.

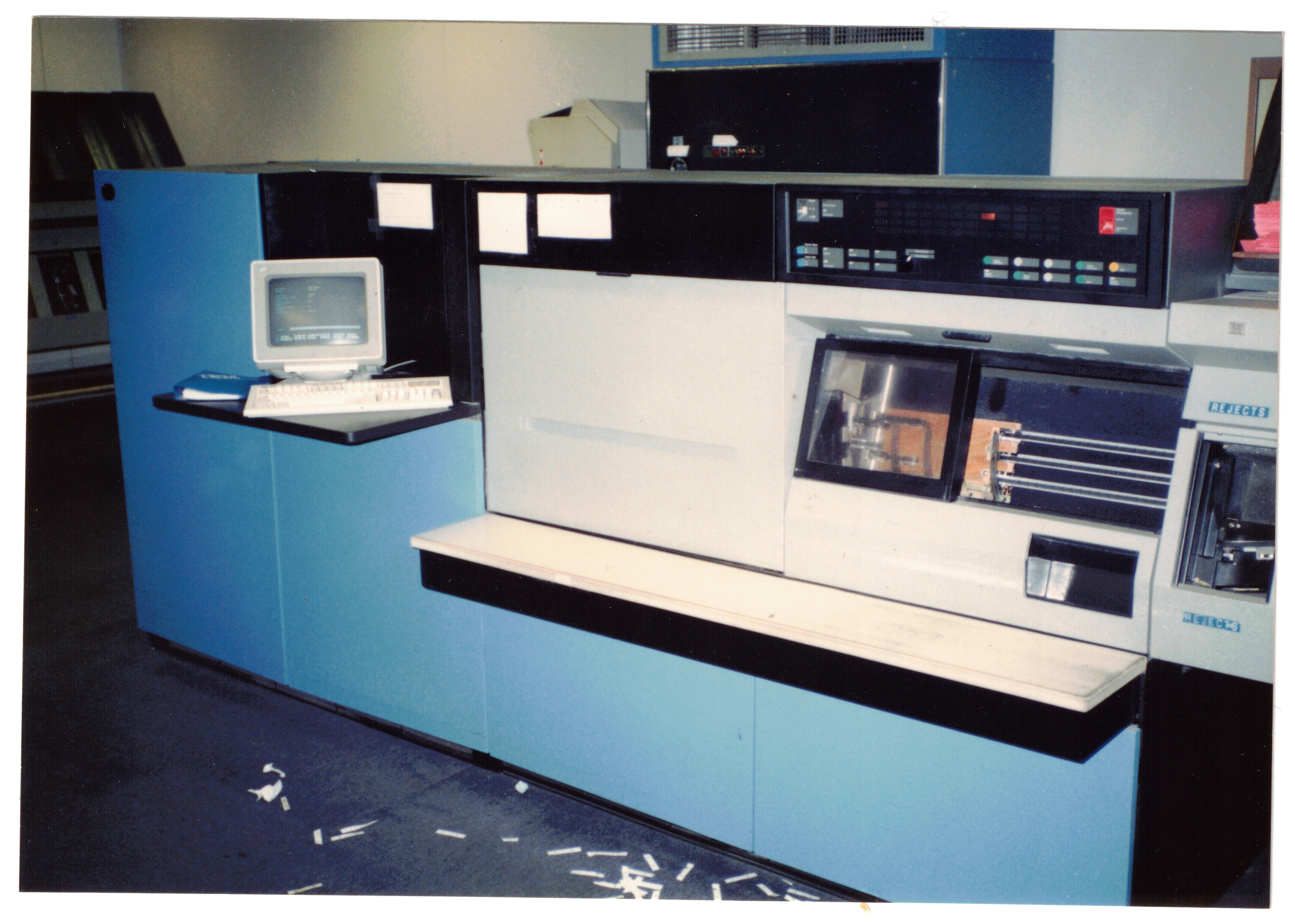
An IBM 3890 Model XP1. You can see the built-in PS/2 Screen and keyboard.

This is a limited table of model differences:

3890 Models
Model	Sorter type	Speed (6" documents)	Control Unit	User Memory	Microfilming module	Announced	Withdrawn
A01 to A06	MICR	2400 documents per minute	IBM System 360/25	13312 byes	Optional	1973/5/22	1988/11/15
B01 to B06	MICR	2400 documents per minute	IBM System 360/25	29969 bytes	Optional	1975/1/27	1988/11/15
C01 to C06	OCR		IBM System 360/25				
D01 to D06	OCR		IBM System 360/25				
E02 to E06	MICR	1680 documents per minute	IBM System 360/25	13312 byes	Standard	E03-E06 & F03-F06 - 1982/6/11 E02 & F02 - July 17, 1984	1988/11/15
F02 to F06	MICR	1680 documents per minute	IBM System 360/25	29969 bytes	Standard	1982/6/11	1988/11/15
XP1	MICR or OCR	2400 documents per minute	IBM PS/2 Model 80	3 million bytes	Optional	1988/11/15	2005/09/27

The MICR type for each sorter was set in the factory and could be E-13B or CMC-7. This was indicated by a feature code.

==== IBM 3897: Image capture system ====
The 3897 Image Capture System was effectively a scanning system which captured images of each cheque using a new special module. It could capture either the front of each cheque (referred to as the Basic Image System) or the front and back of each cheque (referred to as the Full Image System).

The IBM 3898 was used to process the scanned images from the IBM 3897 and was not a module in the 3890 itself. The 3898 was able to recognise printed and handwritten amounts reducing the need for clerical support.

The 3897 and 3898 were announced on March 20, 1990.

==== Example customers ====
A signifiant number of banks used the IBM 3890. Some of them include:

- An article in the May 1979 edition of the ABA Banking Journal described how Mercantile Safe Deposit & Trust Co. of Baltimore went from needing nine staff to handle 17,000 personal checking accounts, to needing two and half staff to handle 40,000 accounts, attributing this efficiency to the purchase of two IBM 3890s.
- An article in the May 1980 edition of the ABA Banking Journal described how Wells Fargo Bank had two check 'capture' locations, one in Los Angeles and another in San Francisco, with 11 IBM 3890s.

==== Withdrawal ====
The 3890 had a long history, shipping from 1973 to 2005. However, in the United States the passing of the Check Clearing for the 21st Century Act (Check 21) on October 28, 2003 (which became effective on October 28, 2004) removed the need to transport and sort checks in large central clearing operations. Thus reducing the need to use large reader/sorters like the IBM 3890.

- IBM stopped shipping the 3890/XP1 with CMC-7 recognition on May 28, 1996
- IBM stopped shipping the 3897 and 3898 on November 29, 1996.
- IBM stopped shipping the 3890/XP1 with OCR recognition on October 30, 1998. After this only the E-13B version was available
- IBM finally withdrew the 3890/XP1 from marketing on September 27, 2005.

=== IBM 3891 ===
IBM 3891 was a document processor that could sort up to 1700 documents per minute into up to 36 pockets. It was announced by IBM on November 21, 1989. There was only one model: the 3891 XP1. It was withdrawn by IBM on November 7, 1995

=== IBM 3892 ===
IBM 3892 was a document processor that could sort up to 1000 documents per minute into up to 36 pockets. It was announced by IBM on November 3, 1987. There were two models: the 001 and the XP1. It was withdrawn by IBM on November 7, 1995

== Hybrid document processors ==
IBM created two products that were essentially hybrids, combining proofing and inscribing, with data capture and sorting.

=== IBM 3694 ===
The IBM 3694 document processor was developed and manufactured by IBM System Products Division (SPD) in Charlotte, North Carolina. It was announced by IBM on July 28, 1980 with first shipments planned for third quarter of 1981. It was designed for bank branches, bureaus, smaller banks and financial institutions and could process up to 400 documents per minute. IBM claimed it could eliminate intermediate manual operations by being able to proof, inscribe, capture data, endorse, number items, microfilm, sort and create master and pocket lists. The 3694 could be modem attached or up to 18 of them could be attached to an IBM 3602 financial communication controller. A 3694 could also be configured as a control unit and have four of them attached to it.

IBM added the options of a Microfilm unit and a "Paid" stamp in May 1981.

At the time of announcement an IBM 3694 unit cost between $46,000 and US$67,500 with leases from $1,020 to US$1,505 per month on a two-year lease. Rental charges ranged from $1,200 to US$1,770 per month.

There were eight models:

IBM 3694 Models
Model	Stacker Modules	Pockets
A01/A02	1	6
B01/B02	2	12
C01/C02	3	18
D01/D02	4	24

Example customers included:

- Citizens National Bank in Somerset Kentucky.
- Federal Employees Credit Union (FECU) who purchased one around 1982 attached to an IBM 4341
- First National Bank of Warsaw in Indiana
- The National Bank of Coxsackie in New York State, who purchased one in April 1982 and attached it to a System/34.

==== Endorsement printing issue ====
On September 1, 1988, a federally mandated software change was made by IBM to the IBM 3694 to ensure endorsements were printed within a prescribed zone on the back of each document. This change resulted in a tracking number no longer being printed on the cheque which significantly increased audit times. IBM committed to resolving the issue in the first quarter of 1989.

The IBM 3694 was withdrawn by IBM on April 23, 1990.

=== IBM 3895 ===
IBM 3895 name plate

The IBM 3895 Document Reader/Inscriber is an automatic document processing machine designed for large commercial banks, announced by IBM on April 5, 1977. It was developed by IBM Charlotte and manufactured by IBM Endicott. The machine attaches to a multiplexer, selector, or block multiplexer channel on IBM System/370, supporting Models 125-2, 135, 138, 145, 148, 155 II, 158, 165 II, and 168.

The primary function of the 3895 is to read the hand-printed or machine-printed dollar and cent amount on a cheque or deposit slip, transmit that value to the host processor, inscribe the amount onto the document in magnetic ink, endorse the document, and route it to a designated output pocket. The machine processes documents at a rated speed of 525 six-inch documents per minute, though actual throughput varies with document size and the combination of functions performed. IBM claimed at the time of launch that a bank could use a 3895 to proof over 100,000 documents per day, eliminating the need for proof machine operators. However, Mellon Bank in Pittsburgh in 1981 was seeing a 50% reject rate, meaning half the documents scanned still needed to be manually proofed.

==== Architecture ====
The 3895 is microcode-controlled and uses a 33FD flexible disk drive as its loading device. It provides 136K bytes of storage in total: 72K for control storage and 64K for document information. The processor comprises 26 boards of logic.

The machine incorporates both electronic and electromechanical technologies. The electronic components use transistor–transistor logic (TTL), SMS, SLT, and MST with cathode ray scanning. The electromechanical subsystems include a MICR reader based on the IBM 1255, an OCR reader based on the IBM 1287, a combined printer/inscriber unit, and an endorser.

==== Standard features ====
The 3895 includes the following functional units, all controlled by the user's application program:

- Main Feed — transports deposit slips and cheques through the machine
- Merge Feed — injects special documents into the processing stream
- MICR — two readers: number 1 reads the pre-encoded MICR codeline; number 2 verifies the inscribe operation
- Scanner — optically reads the hand-printed or machine-printed dollar and cent amounts on documents
- Printer — prints in OCR-B font
- Inscriber — inscribes amounts in E13B magnetic ink font
- Endorser and Stacker — endorses documents and routes them to output pockets

==== Models ====
Two models are available, differentiated by output stacker capacity:

- Model I — 6-pocket stacker
- Model II — 12-pocket stacker

The IBM 3895 was withdrawn by IBM on July 25, 1980.

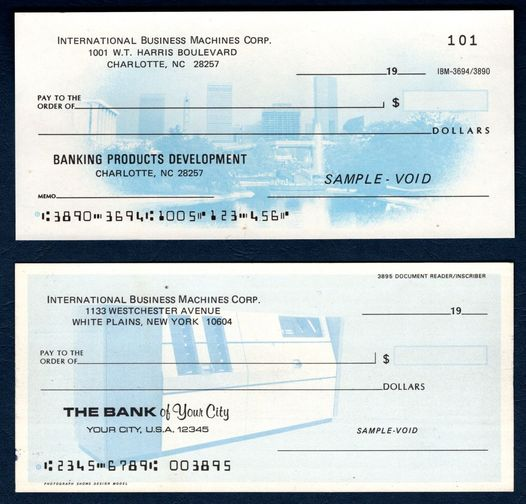
Two test checks that the IBM development team in Charlotte printed for internal use. The first shows the Charlotte skyline at that time. The second shows the IBM 3895 Model II sorter.

== Mechanical jogger ==
While IBM did not manufacture or sell a mechanical jogger, the use of a jogger was considered mandatory with all document sorters. A jogger effectively used vibration to get all the documents to align nicely. In the photograph of the 3890 used in this article the jogger can be seen directly behind the operator.

== Cheque vs Check vs Document ==
Note that while IBM referred to the 3890 as a Document Processor, it is also referred to as both a cheque sorter or a check sorter. In countries like Australia, and the United Kingdom, a bill of exchange drawn on a bank payable on demand is a "cheque", while in the US this is referred to as a "check". Because the 3890 could also sort documents using OCR (rather than a MICR line printed with E-13B or CMC-7), the official IBM term for the 3890 was a Document Processor.

== See also ==
IBM banking equipment
