= IBM optical mark and character readers =

Optical mark and character readers made and sold by IBM

IBM optical readers
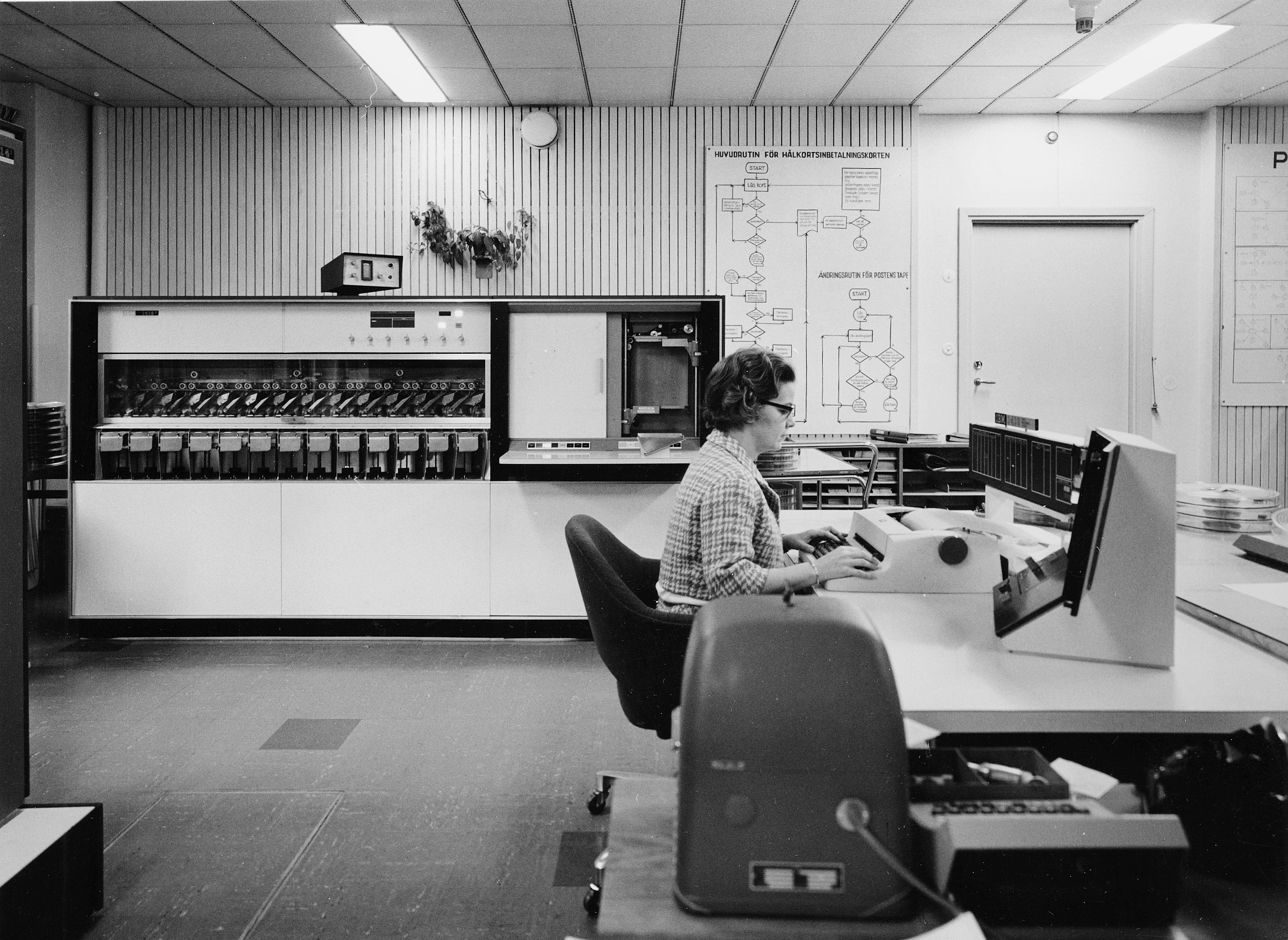
- IBM 1418 and IBM 1415 in Postgirots datacentre
- Date invented: 1960
- Discontinued: 1984

IBM designed, manufactured and sold optical mark and character readers from 1960 until 1984. The IBM 1287 is notable as being the first commercially sold scanner capable of reading handwritten numbers.

== Initial development work ==
IBM Poughkeepsie studied machine character recognition from 1950 till 1954, developing an experimental machine that used a cathode-ray-tube attached an IBM 701 which performed the character analysis. They pursued a technique known as lakes and bays which examined different areas of dark and light where the lakes were white areas enclosed by black and the bays were partially enclosed areas. Their machine and mission was moved to IBM Endicott in 1954, where research continued. From 1955 to 1956 they then worked on the VIDOR (Visual Document Reader) program, but they could not get agreement on acceptable reject rate. The developers felt 80% recognition was acceptable (meaning 20% of documents would need to be manually processed), while product planners and IBM Marketing felt that compared to punched card, the reject rate was unacceptably high. This led to no new products being released.

In 1956 the American Bankers Association chose to use Magnetic Ink Character Recognition (MICR) to automate check handling, rejecting a proposed solution generated by an IBM Poughkeepsie banking project that used optical characters formed by vertical bars and digits. IBM developed a magnetic read head to handle the new standard, releasing the IBM 1210 MICR reader/sorter in 1959. The development work for this product both with read heads and document handling, helped move optical character recognition forward, with development focusing on reading one or two lines of print from a paper document larger than an IBM punched card. The first product to be released was the IBM 1418.

== IBM 123x Optical Mark Readers ==
The IBM 1230, IBM 1231, and IBM 1232 were optical mark readers used to input the contents of data sources such as questionnaires, test results, surveys as well as historical data that could be easily entered as marks on sheets. Educational institutes used them to score test results and they were effectively a replacement for the IBM 805 Test Scoring Machine that used electrical resistance and a mark sense pencil to score a test, rather than optical mark detection. They were developed and manufactured by IBM Rochester.

They have the following features:

- A pneumatic input hopper that can hold approximately 600 sheets
- Two output stackers: the normal stacker that holds 600 sheets and the select (or reject) stacker which holds 50 sheets.
- Pluggable SMS printed circuit cards
- They can read positional marks made by a lead pencil using an optical read head that consists of photovoltaic(solar) cells and lamps
  - The 1230 has 21 photovoltaic cells, 20 for reading the pencil marks and one to read timing marks on the right hand border of the sheet.
  - The 1231 and 1232 have 22 photovoltaic cells, 20 to read data, one to read timing marks and one to read a special feature called a master mark.
- Input size is a 8 1/2 in × 11 in (22 cm × 28 cm) sheet called a data sheet that can have up to 1000 marked or printed positions per side.
- Uses electromechanical devices known as sonic delay lines to store results.

IBM 1230 Family
Machine Type Model	Sheets per hour	Attachment	Announced	Withdrawn	Length	Width	Height	Weight	Heat output/hr
1230	1200	Offline, optional card punch	November 2, 1962	January 30, 1980	44 in (110 cm)	24 in (61 cm)	45 in (110 cm)		
1231-1	2000	IBM 1130, 1401, 1440, 1460	November 2, 1963	January 30, 1980	44 in (110 cm)	24 in (61 cm)	45 in (110 cm)	620 lb (280 kg)	3,700 BTU (930 kcal)
1231-N1	2000	IBM System/360	April 7, 1964	January 30, 1980	44 in (110 cm)	24 in (61 cm)	45 in (110 cm)	620 lb (280 kg)	3,700 BTU (930 kcal)
1232	2000	IBM 534 Model 3 Card Punch	November 2, 1963	January 30, 1980	44 in (110 cm)	24 in (61 cm)	45 in (110 cm)		

=== IBM 1230 Optical Mark Scoring Reader ===
The IBM 1230 is an offline optical mark scoring machine announced on 2 November 1962 that was designed to read and scores 1,200 answer sheets per hour.

- Scored results are printed via a wire matrix printer on the right margin of each answer sheet as it is processed.
- Two master sheets are required for the process: one that encoded the correct answers and one for the machine to record run information.
- Output could be sent to an IBM 534 Model 3 Card Punch as an option, which limits throughput to 750 sheets per hour when punching 80 columns of data.

=== IBM 1231 Optical Mark Page Reader ===
The IBM 1231 is an online optical mark reader that was designed to read and score 2000 test answer sheets per hour, depending on downstream operations.

- The correct answers for the test can either be entered using a master sheet (like the 1230) or sent to the 1231 using the optional master-mark special feature.

=== IBM 1232 Optical Mark Page Reader ===
The IBM 1232 is an offline optical mark reader that was designed to read up to 2000 marked sheets per hour.

- Documents can be read at up to 2000 sheets per hour, but this depends on the number of characters that need to be punched from each sheet.
- The IBM 1232 reads the marks and then punches them into cards using a IBM 534 Model 3 Card Punch. Together they can read up to 64,000 characters per hour or 800 fully punched cards.

=== Example customers ===
- The California Test Bureau (CTB) that provided standardised achievement tests for educational institutes across the USA, began replacing their IBM 805s with IBM 1230s in 1963. They then installed two IBM 1232s in 1964. Being able to use a full 8 1/2 in × 11 in (22 cm × 28 cm) answer sheet rather than a 7 3/8 in × 3 1/4 in (18.7 cm × 8.3 cm) mark sense card, eliminated the need to use multiple answer cards per test per student, as well as dramatically increased the marking speed for test answers.
- Credit Bureau Services of Dallas used an IBM 1232 in 1966 as part of their first computerisation project. They marked credit history data onto optical scanning sheets that were fed into their IBM 1232. The attached IBM 534 then punched this data onto punched cards, which were then fed into their IBM System/360 Model 30.
- In 1968 the US Army Corps of Engineers Coastal Engineering Research Center (CERC) began using special log books for their coastal surveyors to record coastal survey data, which was then converted to punched cards by an IBM 1232.

== IBM 2956 Optical Mark/Hole Reader ==
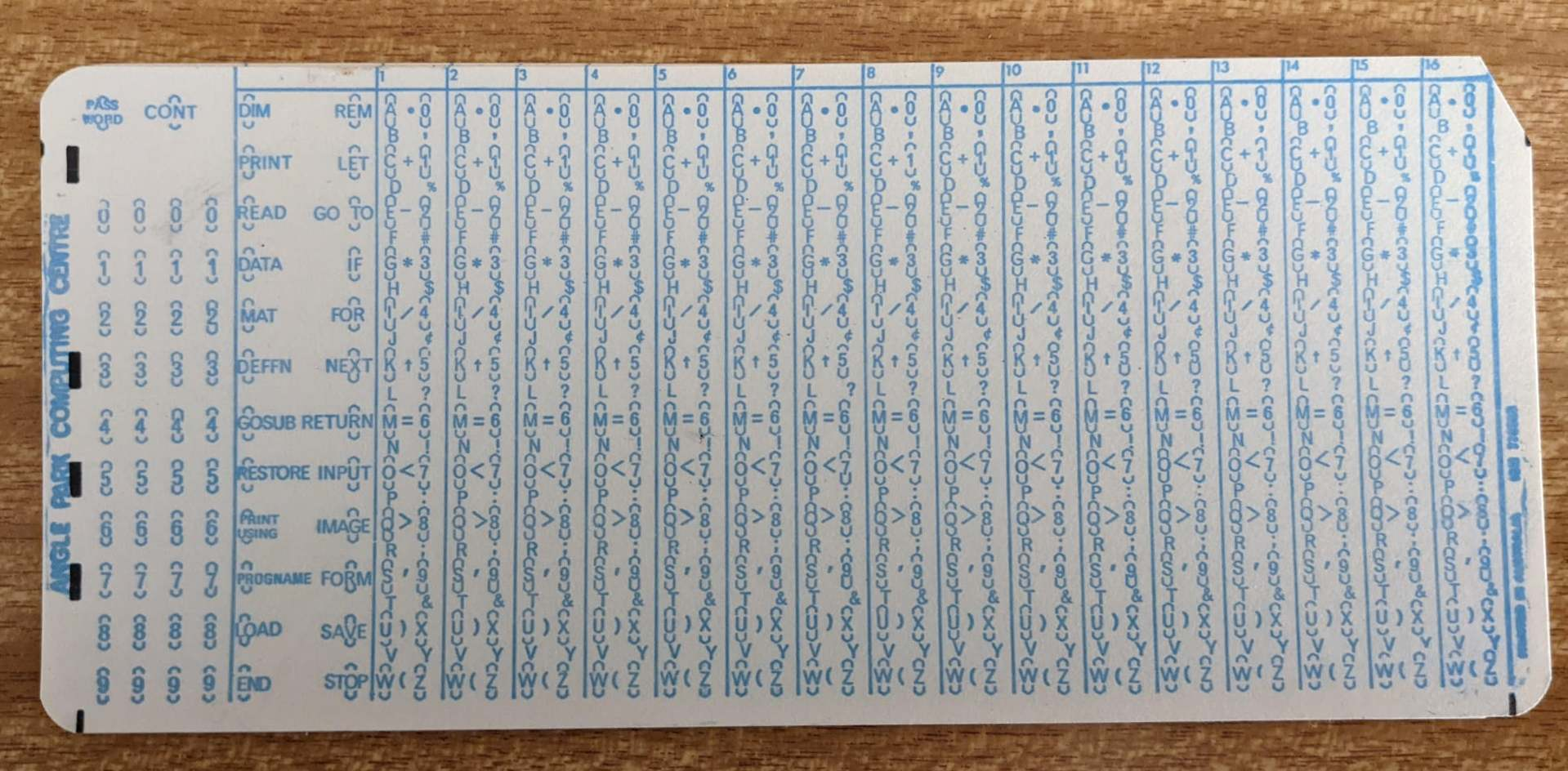
Mark sense card

The IBM 2956 Models 2 and 3 are custom build optical mark/hole readers designed to be attached to an IBM 2740 Communications Terminal.

- The IBM 2956-2 can read cards that have either been hand or machine marked or that have been punched. The cards can be fed by hand or from the 400 card hopper. It has a 400 card stacker. The 2956-2 could be ordered by request for price quotation (RPQ) 843086.
- The IBM 2956-3 can read cards that have either been hand or machine marked or that have been punched. It can also read marked sheets up to 9 in × 14 in (230 mm × 360 mm) in size, although only a 3 1/4 in (83 mm) band along the side of the sheet can be read (the width of a punched card). It does not have a hopper or a stacker, so each card or sheet must be manually fed into the machine. The 2956-3 could be ordered by request for price quotation (RPQ) 843106. The 2956-3 could be attached to an IBM 3276 or IBM 3278 display station with RPQ UB9001.

One use case for the IBM 2956 is to grade school tests. On completion of a learning module a student can use an optical scan-type card to record answers to up to 27 questions, with up to 5 choices per question. They are scanned by the reader and the results are then transmitted to an IBM System/360 in remote job entry mode and can also be printed on the IBM 2740. The reader can also be attached to an IBM 3735 which transmits results to an IBM System/370 and which prints results on an IBM 3286 printer. They can also be attached to an IBM System/3.

IBM 2956
Model	Length	Width	Height	Weight	Heat output/hr
2	26 in (66 cm)	15 in (38 cm)	39 in (99 cm)	156 lb (71 kg)	1,350 BTU (340 kcal)
3	26 in (66 cm)	15 in (38 cm)	30 in (76 cm)	150 lb (68 kg)	1,350 BTU (340 kcal)

Note that the IBM 2956 Model 5 (2956-5) was a banking reader/sorter.

== IBM 1282 Optical Reader Card Punch ==
The IBM 1282 is an offline optical reader that is used to read embossed credit card receipts, a mark read field or machine printed characters in three different fonts. It then outputs this data onto a punched card. It was developed and manufactured by IBM Endicott. It proved popular and within two years of announcement 100 machines were installed or on order.

IBM 1282
Announced	Withdrawn	Length	Width	Height	Weight	Heat output/hr
October 2, 1963	January 30, 1980.					

=== Example customer ===
- The New York Department of Motor Vehicles reported that from 1964 until 1968 they were using an IBM 1282 to read machine printed license renewal slips that had been mailed back as part of the renewal process. They would scan the slip and then process the resulting punched card. This worked well until the DMV decided to request renewals include the drivers Social Security Number (SSN), which meant a handwritten number needed to be either manually keyed or a new scanning device procured. They switched to the IBM 1287 in 1968.

== IBM 1285 Optical Reader ==
The IBM 1285 is an online optical reader that is used to read printed paper tapes from cash registers or adding machines. It was developed by IBM Endicott and manufactured by IBM Rochester. The IBM 1285 attaches to an IBM 1401, 1440, 1460 or System/360. It has a small round screen to display characters being read and it has a keyboard to enter header information and to optionally enter character corrections for rejected characters. It can read a 200 ft (61 m) roll or paper tape in three-and-a half minutes, reading data at speeds of up to 3000 lines per minute. It can mark the tape with a dot to indicate unreadable characters, so they can be rekeyed later. It users System/360 SLT circuitry and scans with an electronic beam of light called a "flying spot".

IBM 1285
Announced	Withdrawn	Length	Width	Height	Weight	Heat output/hr
April 21, 1964	September 8, 1970	71 1/4 in (181 cm)	35 3/4 in (91 cm)	60 in (150 cm)	1,600 lb (730 kg)	5,000 BTU (1,300 kcal)

== IBM 1287 Optical Reader ==
The IBM 1287 is an online reader that can optically scan printed paper tapes and cut form documents to generate input data for an IBM System/360 or System/370 host. It can read machine printed data as well as handprinted numbers and optical marks (based on installed model and features). IBM claim it is the first commercial scanner that can read hand written numbers written in pencil. It was developed and manufactured by IBM Rochester and first shipped in January 1968.

An engineering model was famously demonstrated at the IBM Pavilion of the 1964-1965 World Fair in New York. IBM representatives at the stand invited visitors to write a date on a card (as far back as September 18, 1851) which was then scanned by the machine and a headline from The New York Times newspaper for the matching date was then printed on a souvenir card. The attached IBM 1460 had nearly 40,000 headlines in storage. This promotional exercise also gave IBM handwriting samples to test with.

It has the following features:

- An input hopper that holds an 11 in (28 cm) stack of documents.
- Three output stackers that can each hold a 4 in (10 cm) stack of documents.
- Documents to be scanned can range from 2 1/4 in × 3 in (5.7 cm × 7.6 cm) to 5.91 in × 9 in (15.0 cm × 22.9 cm) in size.
- Based on document size, throughput ranges from 665 documents per minute for a 3 in (7.6 cm) document with one field of 20 machine printed characters to less than 100 documents per minute for a 6 in (15 cm) document with 50 fields of handprinted characters.
- Has a CRT to display unrecognised characters (after 10 attempted scans) and a keyboard for the operator to enter a correction.
- A serial number feature to print a number from 00000 to 99999 on each document.

Each model has different default recognition capabilities, but additional capabilities can be added as part of the machine order. For instance numeric handwriting recognition can be plant installed on Models 1-4 by ordering a feature code.

- Model 1: Reads numeric printed data from cut sheet paper or cards.
- Model 2: Reads numeric printed data from cut sheet paper or cards or a 200 ft (61 m) continuous roll of paper (such as a journal tape).
- Model 3: Same as Model 1 but also can read OCR A front.
- Model 4: Same as Model 2 but also can read OCR A front.
- Model 5: Reads numeric handprinted digits and certain alphabetic characters. Feature code 2987 added a "Multifont Preprocessor".

IBM 1287
Machine Type Model	Announced	Withdrawn	Length	Width	Height	Weight	Heat output/hr
1287-1	October 4, 1966	July 17, 1984	125 3/4 in (319 cm)	36 in (91 cm)	60 in (150 cm)	2,900 lb (1,300 kg)	10,000 BTU (2,500 kcal)
1287-2	October 4, 1966	November 22, 1978	125 3/4 in (319 cm)	36 in (91 cm)	60 in (150 cm)	2,900 lb (1,300 kg)	10,000 BTU (2,500 kcal)
1287-3	July 15, 1968	July 17, 1984	185 3/4 in (472 cm)	36 in (91 cm)	60 in (150 cm)	3,900 lb (1,800 kg)	13,000 BTU (3,300 kcal)
1287-4	July 15, 1968	November 22, 1978	185 3/4 in (472 cm)	36 in (91 cm)	60 in (150 cm)	3,900 lb (1,800 kg)	13,000 BTU (3,300 kcal)
1287-5 (50 Hz FC2987)		July 17, 1984	156 in (400 cm)	36 in (91 cm)	60 in (150 cm)	3,300 lb (1,500 kg)	12,000 BTU (3,000 kcal)
1287-5 (60 Hz)	Dec 28, 1971	July 17, 1984	125 3/4 in (319 cm)	36 in (91 cm)	60 in (150 cm)	2,800 lb (1,300 kg)	10,000 BTU (2,500 kcal)

=== Example customers ===
- The New York Department of Motor Vehicles reported in 1968 they started using an IBM 1287 after the DMV decided to request driver license renewals include the drivers Social Security Number (SSN). The IBM 1287 could read both the machine printed data on the renewal slip as well as the drivers hand written SSN. Around two thirds of returned renewals could be scanned with this system.

== IBM 1288 Optical Page Reader ==
The IBM 1288 is an online reader that can optically scan cut sheet pages to generate input data for an IBM System/360 or System/370 host, reading the OCR-A font, handprinted numbers (with an optional feature) and/or optical marks (with an optional feature). It was developed and manufactured by IBM Rochester and first shipped in July 1969. The use of the word "Page" in the product name reflects the ability of the IBM 1288 to scan full size pages, nearly twice as large as the IBM 1287.

It has the following features:

- An input hopper that can hold a 10 in (250 mm) stack of documents.
- Two output stackers that can each hold either a 4.5 in (110 mm) stack of short documents or a 3 in (76 mm) stack of long documents. One output stacker is reserved for documents with unrecognisable characters.
- Documents to be scanned can range from 3 in × 6.5 in (76 mm × 165 mm) to 9 in × 14 in (230 mm × 360 mm) in size.
- A serial number feature to print a number from 00000 to 99999 on each document.
- IBM did not publish a maximum throughput value, stating it would vary based on a variety of factors such as document size and the number and type of fields to be read.

IBM 1288
Announced	Withdrawn	Length	Width	Height	Weight	Heat output/hr
July 15, 1968	November 1, 1983.	175 1/2 in (446 cm)	41 1/2 in (105 cm)	60 in (150 cm)	3,900 lb (1,800 kg)	13,000 BTU (3,300 kcal)

It is composed of three frames:

IBM 1288 frames
Frame	Purpose	Length	Weight
1	Stacker	55 in (140 cm)	1,160 lb (530 kg)
2	Feed module	60 in (150 cm)	1,280 lb (580 kg)
3	Controller	60 1/2 in (154 cm)	1,460 lb (660 kg)

=== Example customers ===
- The City of Baltimore used an IBM 1288 to prepare such things as property tax bills, water meter bills, income tax forms, and to control food stamps.
- The State of Maryland used an IBM 1288 for scanning hand-marked income tax documents sent in by employers. They reported an 85% acceptance rate.
- The German government purchased eleven 1288 to carry out the 1970 census.

== IBM 14x8 Optical Readers ==
The first optical reader released by IBM was the IBM 1418 which could read numbers and vertical bars and which used the same transport as the IBM 1419 cheque sorter. The IBM 1428 was physically very similar to the IBM 1418 (except it did not have a CRT mounted on top), but it was able to read both letters as well as numbers.

=== IBM 1418 Optical Character Reader ===
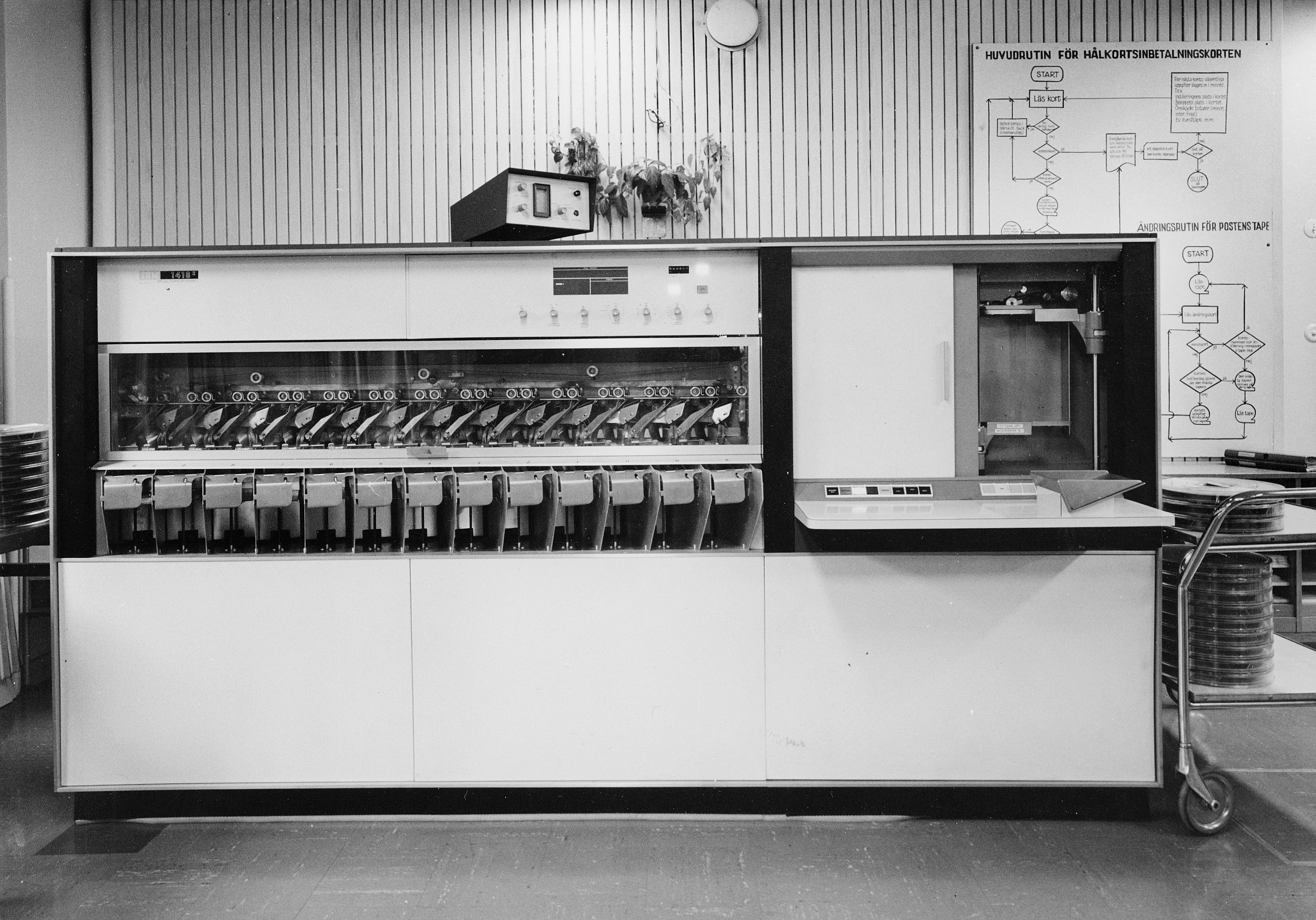
IBM 1418 in Postgirots datacentre

The IBM 1418 is able to read a standard numerical font used by the IBM 407 in one of two sizes. It can also read vertical markings made with a pencil. IBM claimed it is suitable for cash-accounting applications where small payment stubs need to be processed. It was developed and manufactured by IBM Endicott.

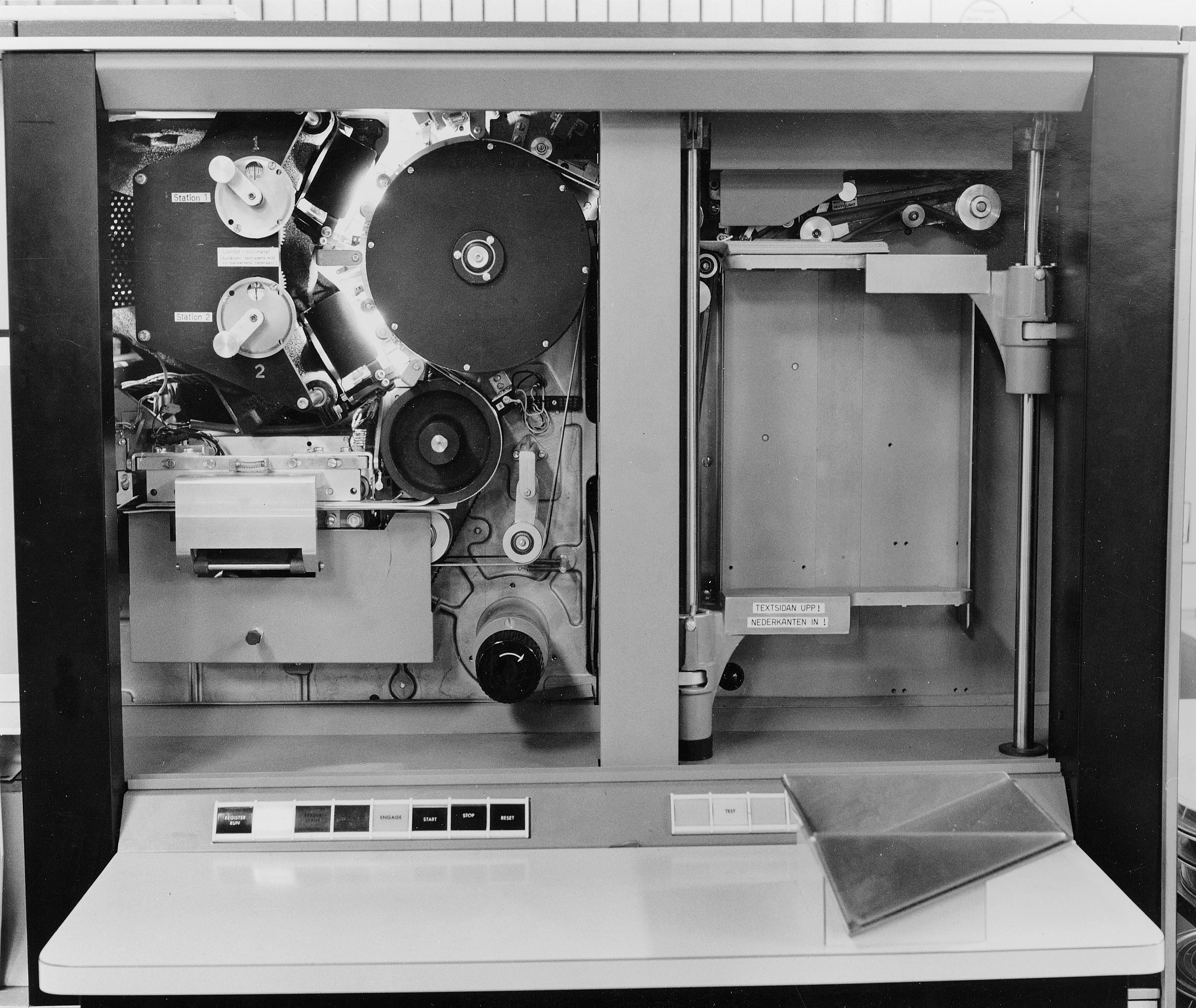
IBM 1418 Document Feed Module

It has the following features:

- It uses a device IBM call a "mechanical image dissector" that reads the characters in multiple vertical bands, that are then combined and tested.
- Is cable connected to either an IBM 1401 or IBM 1410.
- Reading speed is 480 characters per second, up to 400 documents per minute.
- The IBM 1418 features a CRT on the top of the unit that adds 7 3/8 in (19 cm) to the height of the machine.
- The Model 3 is similar to a Model 1 but can handle broader paper size ranges.

IBM 1418
Machine Type Model	Documents per minute	Pockets	Announced	Withdrawn	Length	Width	Height	Weight	Heat output/hr
1418-1	400	3	September 16, 1960	September 8, 1970	112 in (280 cm)	41 1/4 in (105 cm)	60 1/4 in (153 cm)	2,650 lb (1,200 kg)	8,300 BTU (2,100 kcal)
1418-2	400	13	September 16, 1960	September 8, 1970	112 in (280 cm)	41 1/4 in (105 cm)	60 1/4 in (153 cm)	2,700 lb (1,200 kg)	8,300 BTU (2,100 kcal)
1418-3	400	3	February 11, 1963	September 8, 1970	112 in (280 cm)	41 1/4 in (105 cm)	60 1/4 in (153 cm)	2,650 lb (1,200 kg)	8,300 BTU (2,100 kcal)

==== Example customers ====
- The Pennsylvania Power & Light Company claims to have installed the first commercially available IBM 1418. It was used to scan bill stubs returned by their customers including power meter information.

=== IBM 1428 Alphanumeric Reader ===
The IBM 1428 can read alphabetic and numeric scan data from printed documents like payment stubs, but is limited to reading a special font. IBM claimed it is suitable to scan documents such as: "insurance premium notices, charge sales invoices, operations and route slips, payroll and dividend checks and mail orders". It was developed and manufactured by IBM Endicott.

It has the following features:

- It uses a device IBM call a "mechanical image dissector" that reads the characters in multiple vertical bands, that are then combined and tested.
- Is cable connected to either an IBM 1401 or IBM 1410.
- Reading speed is 480 characters per second, up to 400 documents per minute.
- The Model 3 is similar to a Model 1 but can handle broader paper size ranges.

IBM 1428
Machine Type Model	Documents per minute	Pockets	Announced	Withdrawn	Length	Width	Height	Weight	Heat output/hr
1428-1	400	3	April 26, 1962	September 8, 1970	112 in (280 cm)	41 1/4 in (105 cm)	60 1/4 in (153 cm)	2,750 lb (1,250 kg)	10,500 BTU (2,600 kcal)
1428-2	400	13	April 26, 1962	September 8, 1970	112 in (280 cm)	41 1/4 in (105 cm)	60 1/4 in (153 cm)	2,800 lb (1,300 kg)	10,500 BTU (2,600 kcal)
1428-3	400	3	February 11, 1963	September 8, 1970	112 in (280 cm)	41 1/4 in (105 cm)	60 1/4 in (153 cm)	2,750 lb (1,250 kg)	10,500 BTU (2,600 kcal)

== IBM 1975 Optical Page Reader ==
In October 1961 the US Social Security Administration (SSA) requested proposals for OCR equipment to help them reduce the 57 million lines of information they had to manually enter by keyboard each quarter. IBM responded to the SSA in February 1962 using the work of an IBM engineer called Evon Greanias who had developed a curve-follower method that used a CRT flying-spot scanner which not dependent on fixed fonts and in fact had the potential to be used to read handwriting. IBM was requested to provide a more detailed response in May 1963, by which time IBM Research and IBM Rochester (who were now responsible for the project) had developed detailed statistical decision techniques. The one-of-a-kind IBM 1975 was delivered to the SSA in late 1965.

It was used to read a form known as a #941 that contains on average 22 lines per page (to a maximum of 44 lines). It was able to read at a 52 to 55% acceptance rate. It was taken out of service in 1977.

== IBM 388x Optical Readers ==
Released in 1972 and withdrawn in 1984, the IBM 3881 and IBM 3886 are the last family of optical readers released by IBM.

=== IBM 3881 Optical Mark Reader ===
The IBM 3881 is an optical mark reader, meaning it reads machine or hand printed marks, but not OCR fonts or handprinted numbers. It was developed and manufactured by IBM Rochester. There are three models.

It has the following features:

- Documents to be scanned can range from 3 in × 3 in (7.6 cm × 7.6 cm) to 9 in × 9 in (23 cm × 23 cm) in size.
- Throughput is affected by document length. When reading 8 1/2 in × 11 in (22 cm × 28 cm) documents it can read 4,000 per hour.
- A vacuum cleaner is built into the machine.
- The IBM 3881-2 sends scanned data to a directly attached IBM 3410-1 Magnetic Tape Drive. The 27 in × 30 in (69 cm × 76 cm) tape-drive that weighed 180 lb (82 kg) is not included in the physical statistics shown below.

IBM 3881
Machine Type Model	Sheets per hour	Attachment	Announced	Withdrawn	Length	Width	Height	Weight	Heat output/hr
3881-1	4000	IBM S/370	April 24, 1972	July 17, 1984	60 in (150 cm)	24 in (61 cm)	55 in (140 cm)	875 lb (397 kg)	3,500 BTU (880 kcal)
3881-2	4000	Offline	April 24, 1972	July 17, 1984	60 in (150 cm)	24 in (61 cm)	55 in (140 cm)	875 lb (397 kg)	3,500 BTU (880 kcal)
3881-3	4000	IBM S/370	July 15, 1974	July 17, 1984	60 in (150 cm)	24 in (61 cm)	55 in (140 cm)	925 lb (420 kg)	3,800 BTU (960 kcal)

The last IBM 3881 manufactured by IBM Rochester was shipped to a customer in Puerto Rico in January 1980.

=== IBM 3886 Optical Character Reader ===
The IBM 3886 is an optical page reader, meaning it reads OCR fonts or handprinted numbers. It was developed by IBM Rochester and manufactured by both IBM Rochester and IBM Greenock Scotland. There are two models.

It has the following features:

- Documents to be scanned can range from 3 in × 3 in (7.6 cm × 7.6 cm) to 9 in × 12 in (23 cm × 30 cm) in size.
- The input hopper holds a 102 mm (4.0 in) stack of documents
- By default it can read the OCR-A font, but OCR-B and numeric hand printing support can be added.
- The IBM 3886-2 sends scanned data to a directly attached IBM 3410-1 Magnetic Tape Drive. The 27 in × 30 in (69 cm × 76 cm) tape-drive that weighed 180 lb (82 kg) is not included in the physical statistics shown below.
- On July 17, 1974, IBM announced a feature which became known as "Video collect" which allowed an operator to display and re-key characters that could not be recognised. It requires an IBM 3277 console to display the characters in question.

Processing speed ranges from:

- 4.4 documents per minute for a 8 1/2 in × 11 in (22 cm × 28 cm) sheet with 29 lines per sheet and 78 characters per line (2260 characters)
- 94 documents per minute for a 3 in × 3 in (7.6 cm × 7.6 cm) sheet with 1 lines per sheet and 8 characters per line

IBM 3886
Machine Type Model	Attachment	Announced	Withdrawn	Length	Width	Height	Weight	Heat output/hr
3886-1	IBM S/370	October 16, 1972	July 17, 1984	70 in (180 cm)	29 1/2 in (75 cm)	60 in (150 cm)	1,550 lb (700 kg)	7,000 BTU (1,800 kcal)
3886-2	Offline	October 16, 1972	July 17, 1984	70 in (180 cm)	29 1/2 in (75 cm)	60 in (150 cm)	1,550 lb (700 kg)	7,600 BTU (1,900 kcal)

==== Example customers ====
- In 1974 the City and County of Honolulu, Hawaii reported they were using an IBM 3886 to process motor vehicle and bicycle registration renewals, of which they received 400,000 annually. The 3886 scans the renewal forms at up to 5,000 forms an hour, storing them on tape, which is later played-back on their mainframe. They thus avoided the need to manually enter these details onto punched cards.
- In 1975 Union Mutual, a health care provider, reported they were using an IBM 3886 to scan Medicare claims and benefit documents, allowing them to handle a 50% growth in Medicare transactions over two years. They scanned documents to tape, running them later on their System/370. Rejected documents (which averaged 20% for Medicare claims) were re-run using the "video collect" capability that allowed them to key in the correct value and avoid the need to manually key in the whole document. This allowed them to always process documents the same day.
- In 1976 Milgrims Food Stores in Kansas City, Mo, reported they were using an IBM 3886 to scan store delivery forms, resolving a major issue they had tracking vendor deliveries to their stores.

== Advanced Optical Character Reader Postal Service ==
On October 26, 1970, the U.S. Postal Service awarded IBM a US$6.7 million contract to develop the Advanced Optical Character Reader Postal Service. Development was carried out by both IBM Rochester and the IBM Federal Systems Division in IBM Gaithersburg. The goal was to sort 1 million letters in a 24-hour operating period.

In June 1972 the Postal Program group shipped its Advanced Optical Character Reader (AOCR) to the New York City General Post Office in Manhattan. It can scan and sort 24 machine-addressed envelopes per second.

IBM was one of three vendors to deliver a machine in the program. The total cost of the program was US$28.9 million and none of the machines were considered suitable for full-scale production. The IBM contract had a cost over-run of over US$6million dollars.

== IBM OCR reader/sorters ==
IBM released several OCR reader/sorter products mainly for the European finance industry. These are detailed in the IBM document processors article, including the following:

- IBM 1270
- IBM 1275
- IBM 3890 Models C and D
- IBM 3890 XP1 with OCR feature

IBM also released an inscriber that could optically read handwritten amounts to avoid the need to proof a check:

- IBM 3895
