= IBM 1132 =

Line printer, part of the IBM 1130 computer system

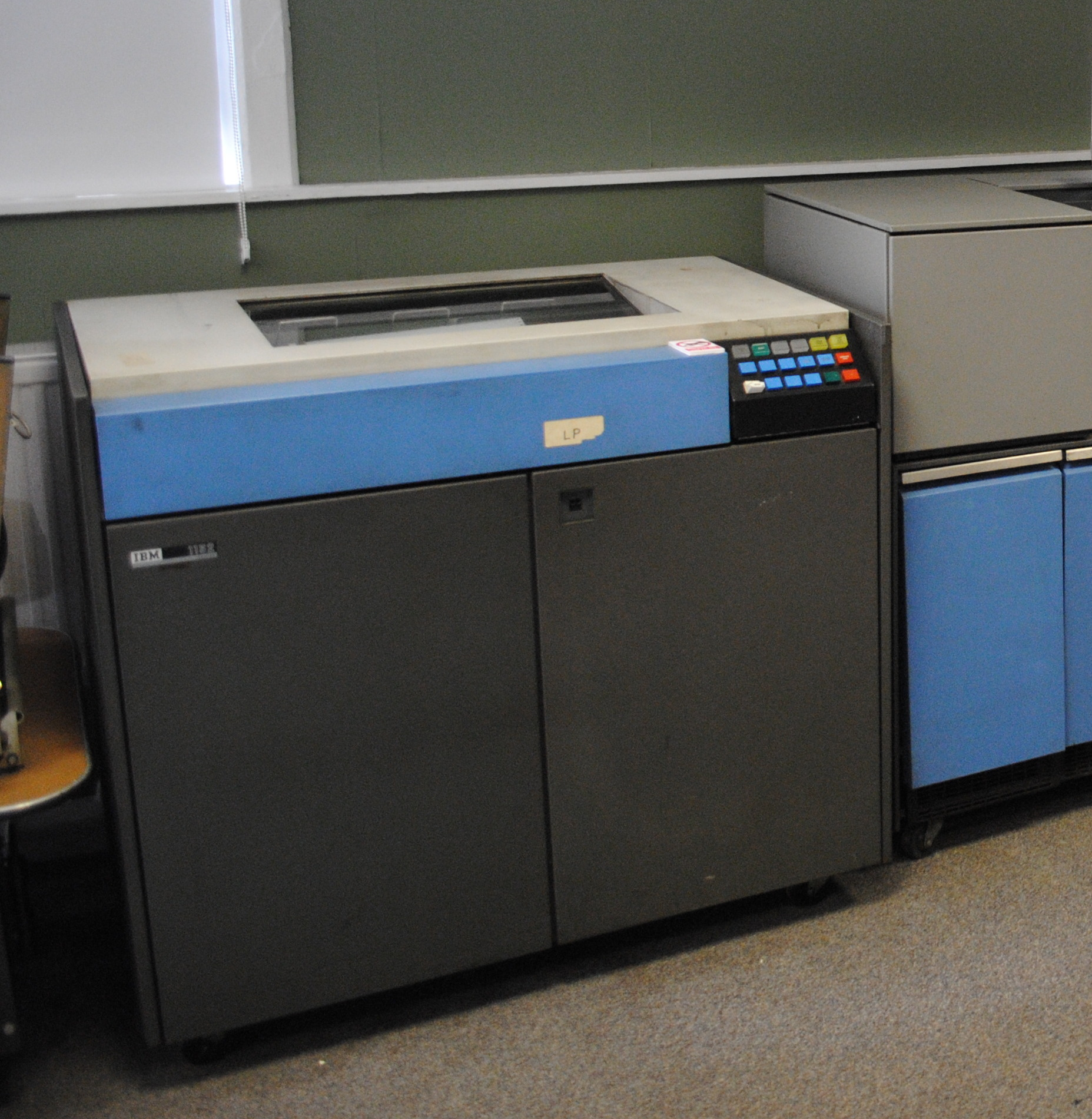
- 1132 printer
- Developer: IBM
- Type: Line printer
- Released: 1965; 61 years ago
- Predecessor: IBM 407
- Related: IBM 1403, IBM 1443

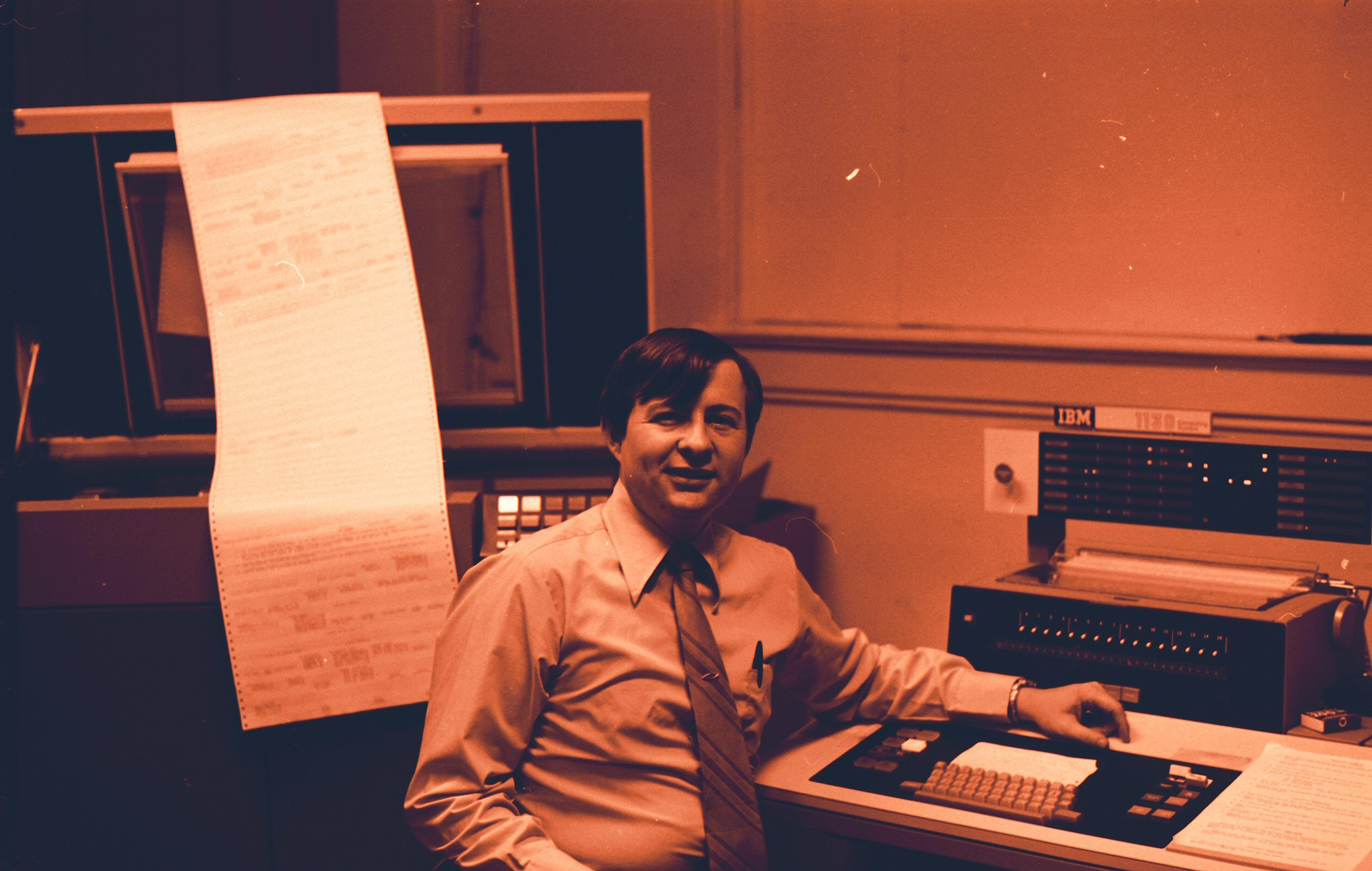
IBM 1130 with IBM 1132 printer in the background, its acoustic cover open.

The IBM 1132 line printer was the normal printer for the IBM 1130 computer system. It printed 120 character lines at 80 lines per minute. The character set consisted of numbers, upper-case letters and some special characters.

The 1965-introduced 1132 was built around a stripped down IBM 407 printing mechanism. (Note: The 407 was introduced 1949) The 407 was IBM's top-of-the-line accounting machine from the 1950s. The 1130 had 120 power transistors, each wired to the print magnet for one printer column. The magnet released a lever that engaged a cam with a spinning clutch shaft. The engaged cam then made one revolution, pushing its print wheel toward the ribbon and paper, thereby printing one character.

As the set of 120 print wheels spun, the 1130 received an interrupt as each of the possible 48 characters was about to move into position. The printing driver software had to quickly output a 120 bit vector designating which transistors were to fire so as to drive the print wheel against the ribbon and paper. This put a big performance burden on the CPU, but resulted in an inexpensive (for the time) printer.

Sometimes a printer output line transistor would fail, resulting in a blank print position. If you knew your way around inside the 1130, it was possible to swap circuit cards so as to move the bad print position to near the right end of the printed line. This kept the 1130 usable until the repair person showed up.

The 1132 came in two models with the following characteristics:

- Standard 48-character-set typewheels with A..Z, 0..9 and the symbols . , + - * / = ( ) ' $ &.
- Model 1 prints up to 80 alphameric or 110 numeric lines per minute and can be attached to 1131 CPU Models 1, 2, 3, and 5.
- Model 2 prints up to 40 alphameric or 55 numeric lines per minute and may be attached only to the 1131 CPU Model 4.
- Standard 120 print-line positions spaced 10 characters per inch.
- Operator selection of vertical line spacing, 6 or 8 lines per inch.
- Forms skipping under program control through automatic, paper-tape-controlled carriage.
- Printer operation under stored-program control through automatic interrupt system.
- Direct connection to the 1131 Central Processing Unit by means of the 1132 Printer Attachment and an Expansion Adapter.
