= IBM 1443 =

Medium speed line printer

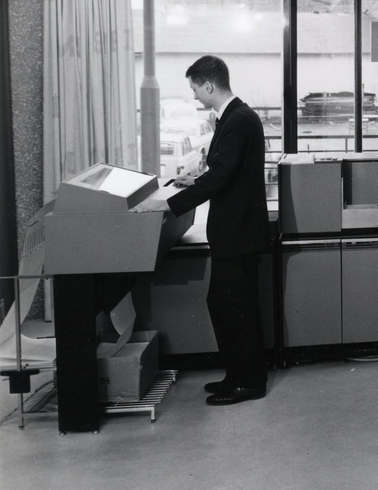
IBM 1443 exposed in the IBM 1460 presentation stand

The IBM 1443 Printer (sometimes referred to as the 1443 Flying Type Bar Printer) was a computer line printer used in the punched card era. It was offered in three models: Models 1, 2 and N1; the last two could print up to 240 lines per minute (LPM) with a full character set.

The 1443 was initially introduced October 11, 1962 for use with the IBM 1440 system and withdrawn February 8, 1971. The printer could also be used on the IBM 1620 (announced 1963), IBM 1710, IBM 1800 and System/360.

Decades later IBM recycled the 1443 model number to refer to a different product.

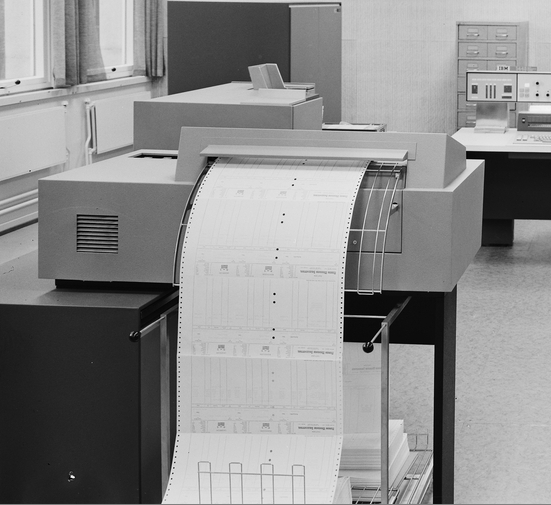
Back side of IBM 1443 printer

== 1443 printing capabilities ==
The IBM 1443 Printer was introduced as part of the IBM 1440 system. The 1443 Model 1 prints alphanumeric, upper-case only, output at a basic rate of 150 lines per minute, and it can print up to 430 lines a minute with a restricted character set, depending upon the type bars used. The Model 2's and Model N1's corresponding speeds are 240 and 600 LPM.

The typebars are easily interchangeable, with options for character sets containing 13, 39, 52, or 63 characters.

The print speeds vary according to the model and the character set.

Character set size	Model 1	Model 2	Model N1
13	430	600	600
39	190	300	300
52	150	240	240
63	120	-	200

The 1443 printer uses 120 or 144 print hammers and hammer magnets, conceptually similar to the IBM 1132 printer's one-per-column print magnets.

Output is formatted at 10 characters per horizontal inch, with a choice of six or eight lines per vertical inch, with additional options for single, double or triple-spacing.

The 1443 uses fan-folded paper with perforated edges for tractor feeding. A carriage control tape specifies form length and the form line where printing was to begin so that paper of various sizes could be used. A carriage control tape simplifies use of pre-printed forms and the programming needed to allow proper alignment.

== Successor technology ==
Type bars were replaced by type wheels or a drum in later printers, most notably:

- IBM 407 - introduced 1949 - type wheels - adapted as an input/output unit on the IBM 650
- IBM 716 - introduced in 1952 with the IBM 701 and others in the IBM 700/7000 series
- IBM 1132 - introduced in 1965 with the low cost IBM 1130 computer system.

The 1132 was the last printer manufactured by IBM to use the 407's technology. In 1959 this technology was superseded with the introduction of the IBM 1403 chain printer; both the 1132 and 1403 were available with the 1130.

== See also ==
- Line printer

== Photos ==
- IBM 1440 system, including a 1443
- IBM 1443 typebars, collection of the Computer History Museum
