= Tabulator =

Tabulator may refer to:

- Tabulating machine, a punched card data processing machine that preceded the computer
- Tab key (↹), a standard keyboard key originally called the "tabulator key"
- Tabulator, a data browser and editor originally developed by Tim Berners-Lee
- A vote-counting machine
