= Tabulating machine =

Late 19th-century machine for summarizing information stored on punch cards

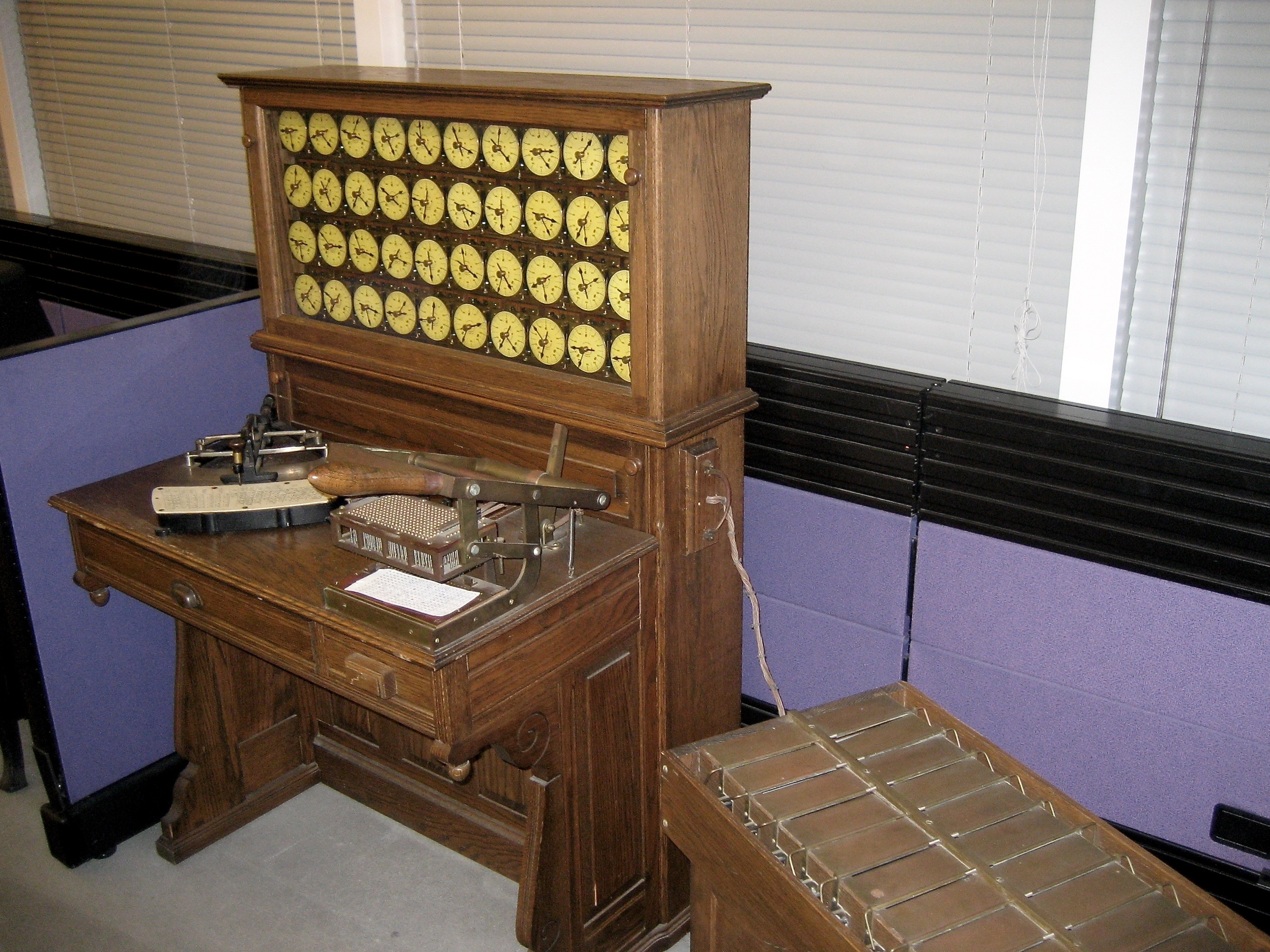
Hollerith 1890 tabulating machine with sorting box. (Note: The "sorting box" was controlled by the tabulator. The "sorter", an independent machine, was a later development. See: Austrian, Geoffrey D. (1982). Herman Hollerith: Forgotten Giant of Information Processing. Columbia University Press. pp. 41, 178–179. ISBN 0-231-05146-8.)

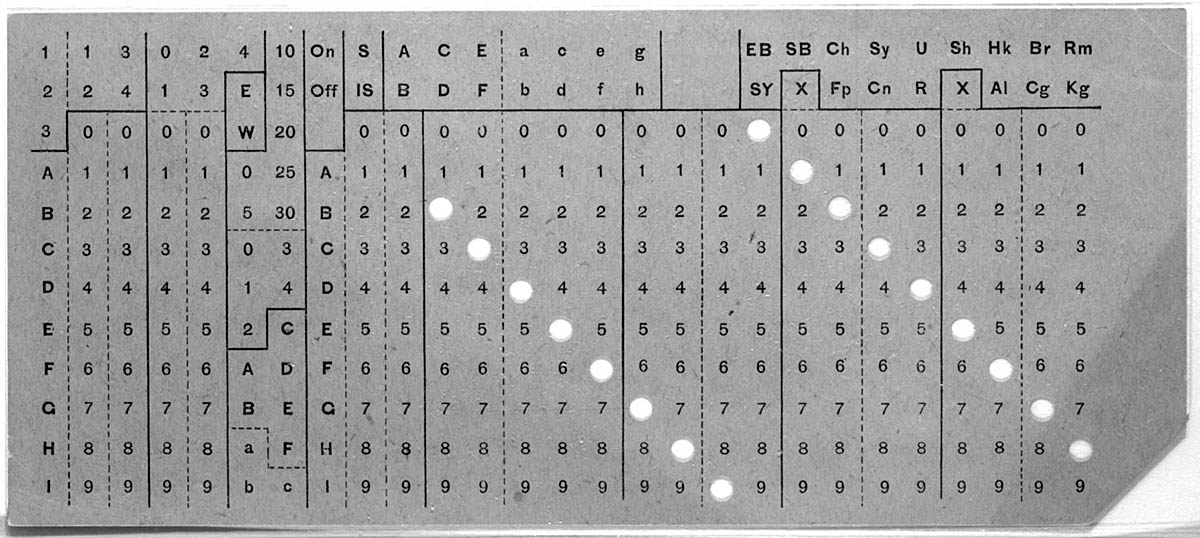
Hollerith punched card

The tabulating machine was an electromechanical machine designed to assist in summarizing information stored on punched cards. Invented by Herman Hollerith, the machine was developed to help process data for the 1890 U.S. Census. Later models were widely used for business applications such as accounting and inventory control. It spawned a class of machines, known as unit record equipment, and the data processing industry.

The term "Super Computing" was used by the New York World newspaper in 1931 to refer to a large custom-built tabulator that IBM made for Columbia University.

== 1890 census ==
The 1880 census had taken eight years to process. Since the U.S. Constitution mandates a census every ten years to apportion both congressional representatives and direct taxes among the states, a combination of larger staff and faster-recording systems was required.

In the late 1880s Herman Hollerith, inspired by conductors using holes punched in different positions on a railway ticket to record traveler details such as gender and approximate age, invented the recording of data on a machine-readable medium. Prior uses of machine-readable media had been for lists of instructions (not data) to drive programmed machines such as Jacquard looms. "After some initial trials with paper tape, he settled on punched cards..." Hollerith used punched cards with round holes, 12 rows, and 24 columns. The cards measured 3 1/4 by 6 5/8 inches (83 by 168 mm). His tabulator used electromechanical solenoids to increment mechanical counters. A set of spring-loaded wires were suspended over the card reader. The card sat over pools of mercury, pools corresponding to the possible hole positions in the card. When the wires were pressed onto the card, punched holes allowed wires to dip into the mercury pools, making an electrical contact that could be used for counting, sorting, and setting off a bell to let the operator know the card had been read. The tabulator had 40 counters, each with a dial divided into 100 divisions, with two indicator hands; one which stepped one unit with each counting pulse, the other which advanced one unit every time the other dial made a complete revolution. This arrangement allowed a count of up to 9,999. During a given tabulating run, counters could be assigned to a specific hole or, by using relay logic, to a combination of holes, e.g. to count married couples. If the card was to be sorted, a compartment lid of the sorting box would open for storage of the card, the choice of compartment depending on the data in the card.

Hollerith's method was used for the 1890 census. Clerks used keypunches to punch holes in the cards entering age, state of residence, gender, and other information from the returns. Some 100 million cards were generated and "the cards were only passed through the machines four times during the whole of the operations." According to the U.S. Census Bureau, the census results were "... finished months ahead of schedule and far under budget."

== Following the 1890 census ==
The advantages of the technology were immediately apparent for accounting and tracking inventory. Hollerith started his own business as The Hollerith Electric Tabulating System, specializing in punched card data processing equipment. In 1896, he incorporated the Tabulating Machine Company. In that year he introduced the Hollerith Integrating Tabulator, which could add numbers coded on punched cards, not just count the number of holes. Punched cards were still read manually using the pins and mercury pool reader. 1900 saw the Hollerith Automatic Feed Tabulator used in that year's U.S. census. A control panel was incorporated in the 1906 Type 1.

In 1911, four corporations, including Hollerith's firm, were amalgamated (via stock acquisition) to form a fifth company, the Computing-Tabulating-Recording Company (CTR). The Powers Accounting Machine Company was formed that same year and, like Hollerith, with machines first developed at the Census Bureau. In 1919, the first Bull tabulator prototype was developed. Tabulators that could print, and with removable control panels, appeared in the 1920s. In 1924, CTR was renamed International Business Machines (IBM). In 1927, Remington Rand acquired the Powers Accounting Machine Company. In 1933, The Tabulating Machine Company was subsumed into IBM. These companies continued to develop faster and more sophisticated tabulators, culminating in tabulators such as 1949 IBM 407 and 1952 Remington Rand 409. Tabulating machines continued to be used well after the introduction of commercial electronic computers in the 1950s.

Many applications using unit record tabulators were migrated to computers such as the IBM 1401. Two programming languages, FARGO and RPG, were created to aid this migration. Since tabulator control panels were based on the machine cycle, both FARGO and RPG emulated the notion of the machine cycle and training material showed the control panel vs. programming language coding sheet relationships.

== Operation ==
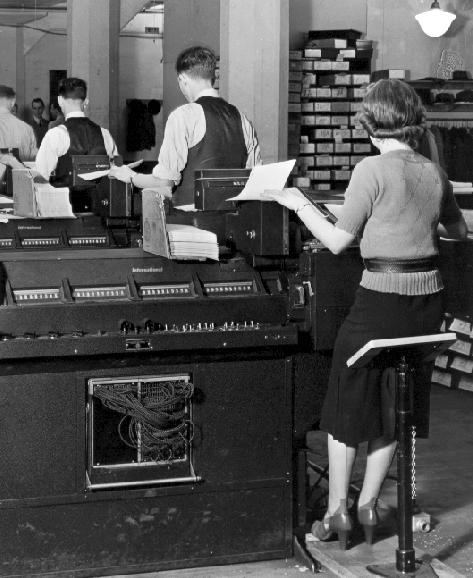
IBM Type 285 tabulators in use at U.S. Social Security Administration circa 1936

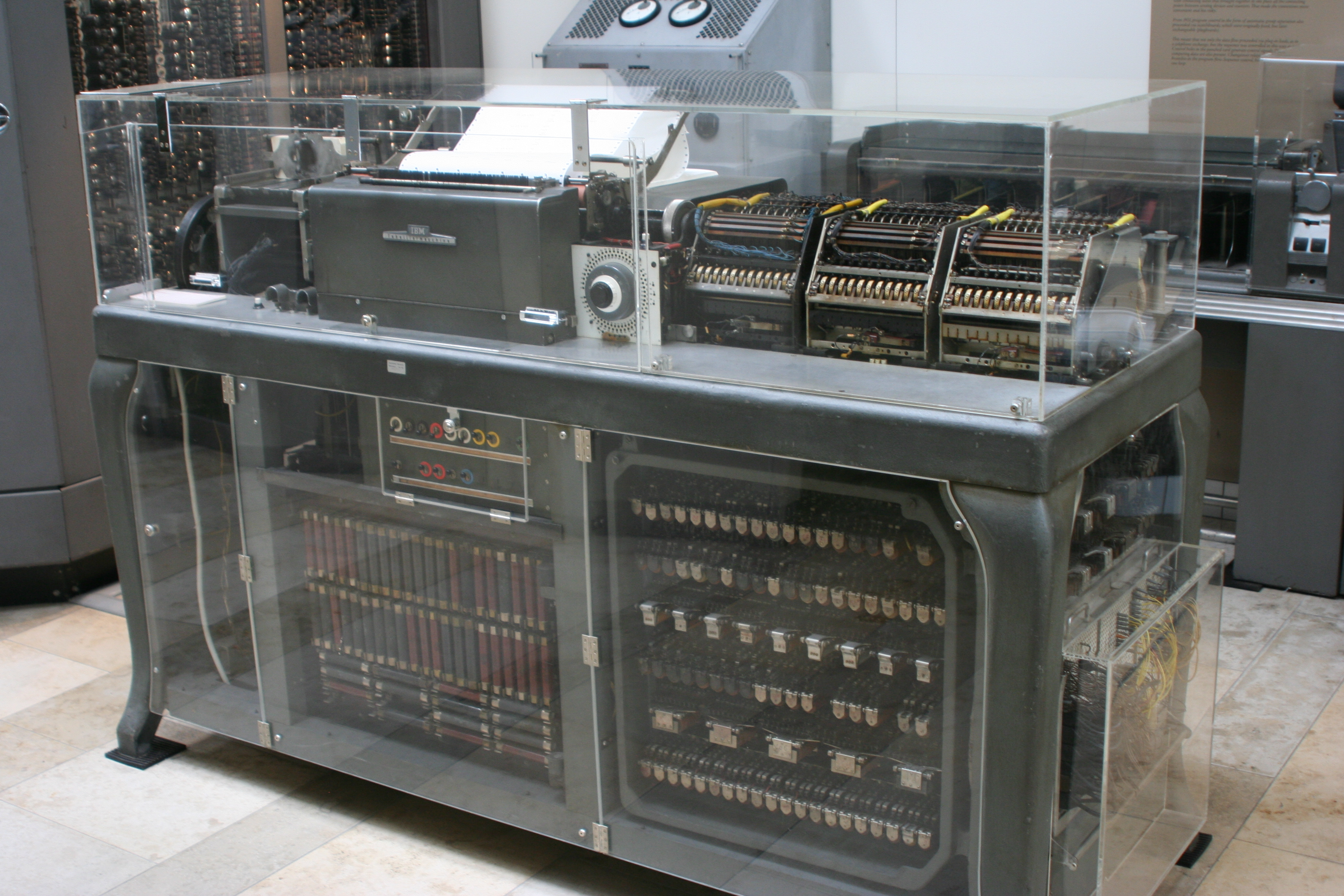
Early IBM D11 tabulating machine, with covers removed

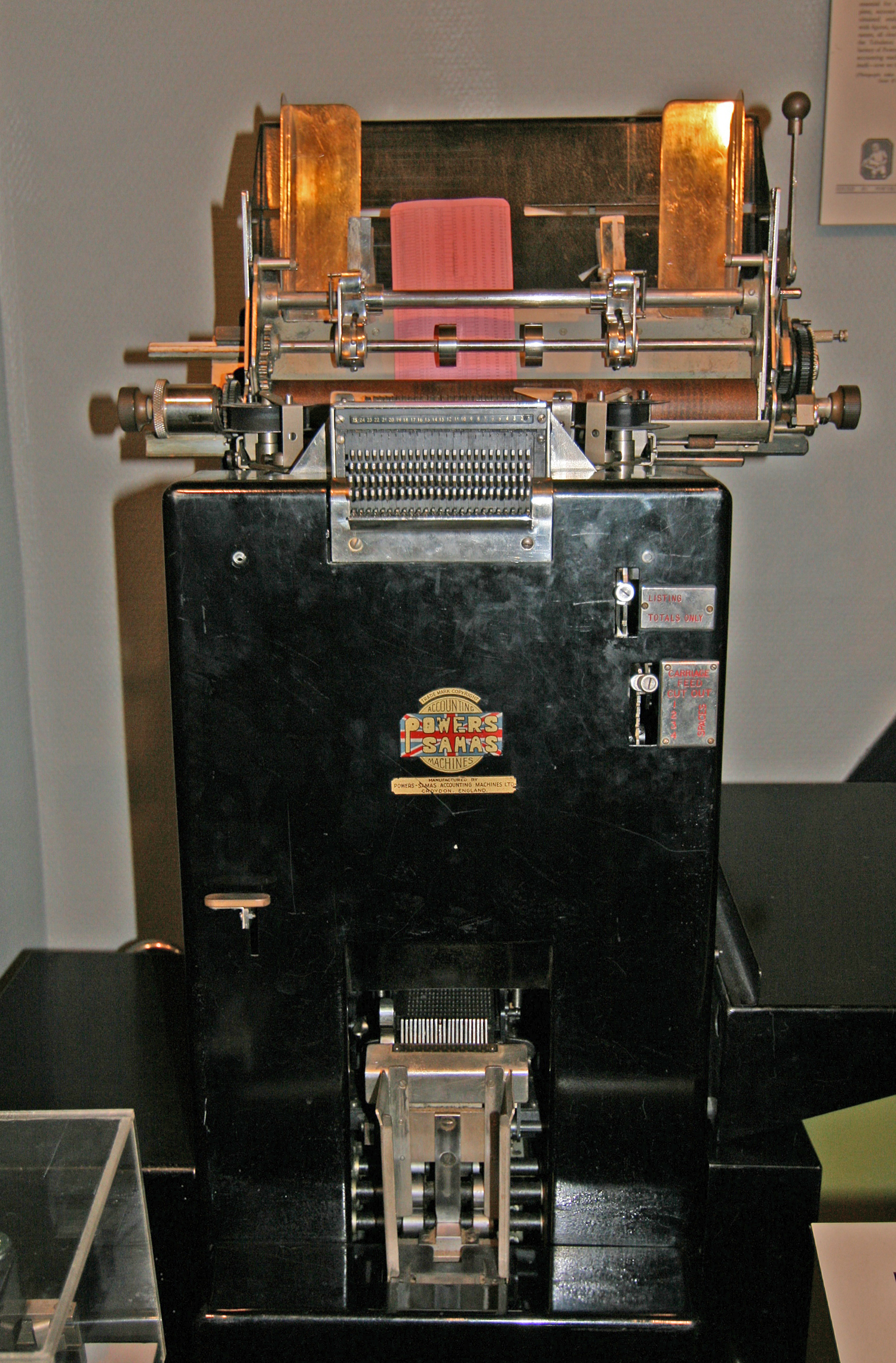
Powers-Samas accounting machine

In its basic form, a tabulating machine would read one card at a time, print portions (fields) of the card on fan-fold paper, possibly rearranged, and add one or more numbers punched on the card to one or more counters, called accumulators. On early models, the accumulator register dials would be read manually after a card run to get totals. Later models could print totals directly. Cards with a particular punch could be treated as master cards causing different behavior. For example, customer master cards could be merged with sorted cards recording individual items purchased. When read by the tabulating machine to create invoices, the billing address and customer number would be printed from the master card, and then individual items purchased and their price would be printed. When the next master card was detected, the total price would be printed from the accumulator and the page ejected to the top of the next page, typically using a carriage control tape.

With successive stages or cycles of punched-card processing, fairly complex calculations could be made if one had a sufficient set of equipment. (In modern data processing terms, one can think of each stage as an SQL clause: SELECT (filter columns), then WHERE (filter cards, or "rows"), then maybe a GROUP BY for totals and counts, then a SORT BY; and then perhaps feed those back to another set of SELECT and WHERE cycles again if needed.) A human operator had to retrieve, load, and store the various card decks at each stage.

== Selected models and timeline ==
Hollerith's first tabulators were used to compile mortality statistics for Baltimore, Jersey City and New York City in 1886.

The first Tabulating Machine Company (TMC) automatic feed tabulator, operating at 150 cards/minute, was developed in 1906.

The first TMC printing tabulator was developed in 1920.

TMC Type IV Accounting Machine (later renamed the IBM 301), from the IBM Archives:

The 301 (better known as the Type IV) Accounting Machine was the first card-controlled machine to incorporate class selection, automatic subtraction, and printing of a net positive or negative balance. Dating to 1928, this machine exemplifies the transition from tabulating to accounting machines. The Type IV could list 100 cards per minute.

H.W.Egli - BULL Tabulator model T30, 1931

IBM 401:

The 401, introduced in 1933, was an early entry in a long series of IBM alphabetic tabulators and accounting machines. It was developed by a team headed by J. R. Peirce and incorporated significant functions and features invented by A. W. Mills, F. J. Furman and E. J. Rabenda. The 401 added at a speed of 150 cards per minute and listed alphanumerical data at 80 cards per minute.

IBM 405:

Introduced in 1934, the 405 Alphabetical Accounting Machine was the basic bookkeeping and accounting machine marketed by IBM for many years. Important features were expanded adding capacity, greater flexibility of counter grouping, (Note: Later IBM tabulators provided multiple, small, counters of 2 to 8 positions. When a larger counter was needed multiple counters could be grouped to function as a single counter. For example, a control panel could be wired to group a 4 position and a 6 position counter, forming a 10 position counter.) direct printing of the entire alphabet, direct subtraction (Note: Before direct subtraction was available, negative numbers were entered as complements or were listed and totaled in separate columns.) and printing of either debit or credit balance from any counter. Commonly called the 405 "tabulator," this machine remained the flagship of IBM's product line until after World War II. The British at Hut 8 used Hollerith machinery to gain some knowledge of Known-plaintext attack cribs used by encrypted German messages.

IBM 402 and 403, from 1948, were modernized successors to the 405.

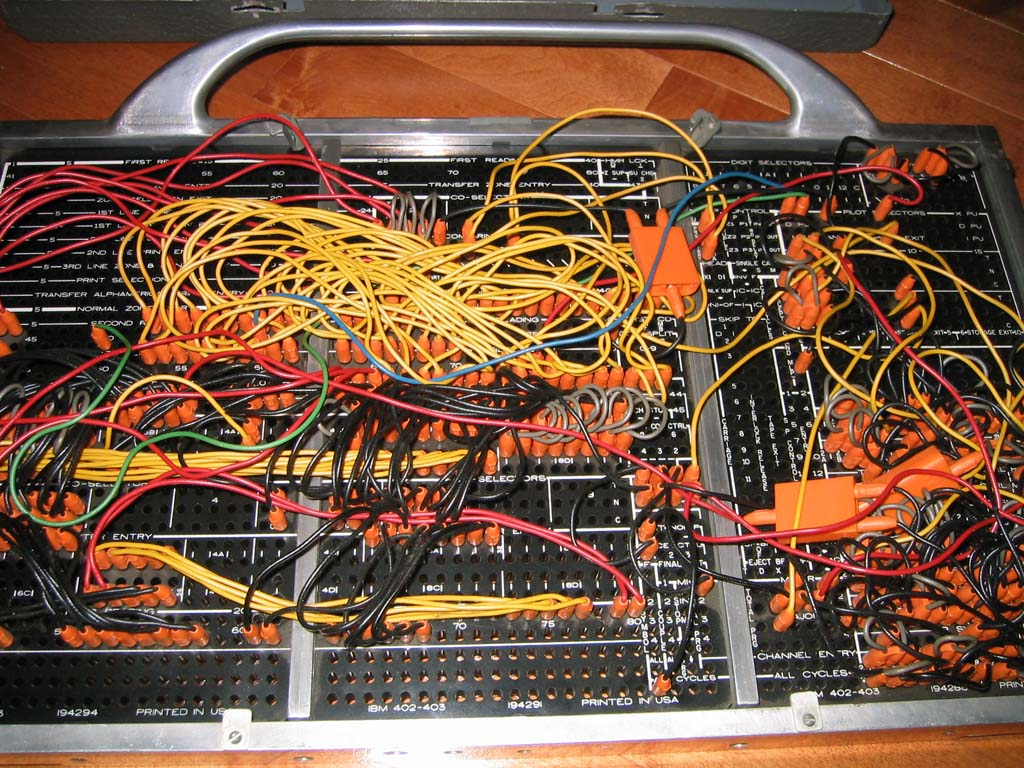
Control panel for an IBM 402 Accounting Machine

The 1952 Bull Gamma 3 could be attached to this tabulator or to a card read/punch.

IBM 407

Introduced in 1949, the 407 was the mainstay of the IBM unit record product line for almost three decades. It was later adapted to serve as an input/output peripheral for several early electronic calculators and computers. Its printing mechanism was used in the IBM 716 line printer for the IBM 700/7000 series and later with the IBM 1130 through the mid-1970s.

The IBM 407 Accounting Machine was withdrawn from marketing in 1976, signaling the end of the unit record era.

IBM 421

== See also ==
- List of IBM products § Tabulators, accounting machines, printers
- British Tabulating Machine Company
- Powers Accounting Machine Company, Powers Accounting Machine
- Powers-Samas Accounting Machines Ltd aka. "Acc and Tab"

For early use of tabulators for scientific computations see

- Leslie Comrie
- Wallace John Eckert
