= IBM 407 =

Tabulating machine introduced in 1949

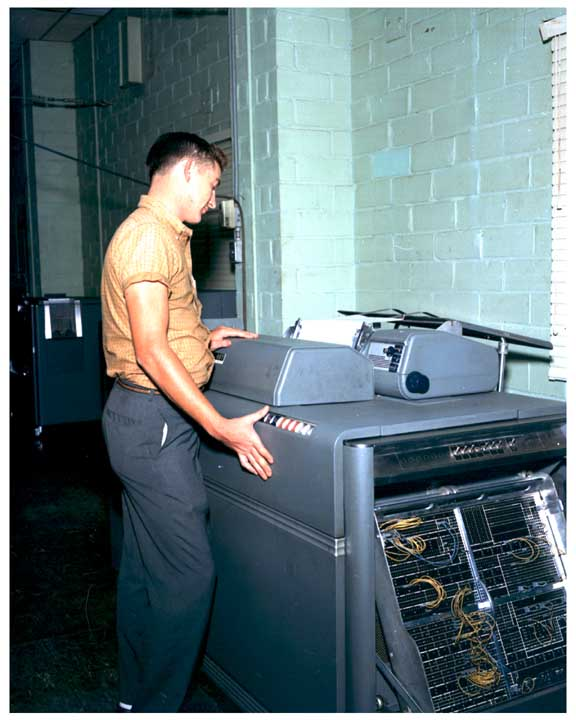
- A 407 at U.S. Army's Redstone Arsenal in 1961.
- Type: tabulating machine
- Released: 1949; 77 years ago
- Predecessor: IBM 401, IBM 405
- Successor: IBM 421; IBM 1400 computer IBM 716 printer
- Related: IBM 402, IBM 403

The IBM 407 Accounting Machine, introduced in 1949, was one of a long line of IBM tabulating machines dating back to the days of Herman Hollerith. It had a card reader and printer; a summary punch could be attached. Processing was directed by a control panel.

The 407 was the central component of many unit record equipment shops which were the mainstay of IBM's business at the time. It could print digits, letters and several special characters in any of 120 print positions, spaced 0.1 inches apart (2.5 mm).

IBM stopped marketing the 407 Accounting Machine in 1976.

== Description ==
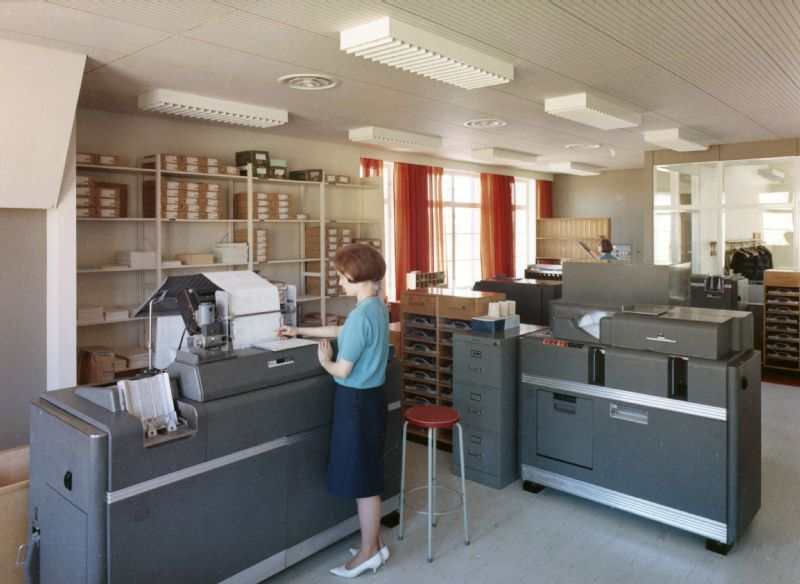
IBM 407 (left) with IBM 519 (on right).

The 407 read punched cards, totaled fields on the cards, made simple decisions, printed results, and, with the aid of a summary punch, output results on punched cards that could be input to other processing steps.

The operation of the 407 was directed by the use of a removable control panel and a carriage tape. Exit hubs (impulse emitting) on the control panel are wired to entry hubs (impulse accepting) for the task to be done (see Wiring of unit record equipment). There are hubs for each card column (at both reading stations), print position, counter digit, and so on. Logic tests were also available.

Each input card was read at two successive reading stations. Thus, for example, fields in a card could be compared with the following card and, should a change be detected, say in invoice number, totals could be printed. Unlike earlier IBM tabulating machines, which had 80 read brushes at each read station, one for each column, the 407 had 960 brushes at each station, one for each possible hole in a punched card. Cards were held in position during each read cycle and the per digit pulses needed were generated using commutators, one for each column. This allowed the card to be read more than once at each station, for greater flexibility.

For printing, the 407 used type wheels, an improvement over earlier tabulators that used print bars. The 48-character wheels were stationary until a character impulse was to be printed; the wheel then rotated in two steps. the first step rotated each wheel to one of 12 groups of characters based on the digit impulse associated with that print position. Digit impulses included the digits 1 through 9 (in reverse order), the 8-3 and 8-4 combination punches and a group (N) for no digit impulse. One of four characters in each group was then selected based on the zone impulse (0, 11, 12 or none) for that character position. This selection happened at the same time the type wheel was driven against the ribbon. The timing of the zone impulse selection was controlled by a complex set of linkages and electromagnets called the Analyzer, one for each of the 120 print positions. Each type wheel also emitted an impulse (called "echo") for the character actually printed. The control panel could be wired so the echo impulses were accumulated for totals; report totals then reliably reflected what had actually been printed.

Mechanical systems including the card reader, printer, counters and storage units were all driven by a single motor, which also drove an oil pump and a generator that provided 46-volt power for the electrical logic. This included about 900 relays which were mounted on three swing-out gates. The control panel had a matrix of 43 by 52 holes, most of which were assigned.

The 407 was available in a model that could read 100 cards per minute, and one reading 150 cards per minute. The former had a relay which would inhibit every third card feed cycle (giving the machine a characteristic "shrink-shrink-thunk" sound). It was possible to insert a folded card between that relay's contacts to "overclock" the slower model to the faster speed.

== Market impact ==
The 407 rented from $800 to $920 per month ($10800 to $12400 per month in 2025 dollars), depending on the model. Its print mechanism was used in the IBM 716 introduced in 1952 with the IBM 701 computer, and the 716 was used with many machines in the IBM 700/7000 series. The 407 itself was adapted as an input/output unit on the IBM 650. Later, the 407 print mechanism was used in the IBM 1132 line printer, part of the low-cost IBM 1130 computer system, introduced in 1965.

The IBM World Trade Corporation marketed Computing Accounting Machines (CAM), variations of either the IBM 402 or 407 with an attached computer. CAM variations of the 407 included the IBM 421, 444, and 447.

== See also ==
- IBM 402
