= IBM 421 =

Early computing device

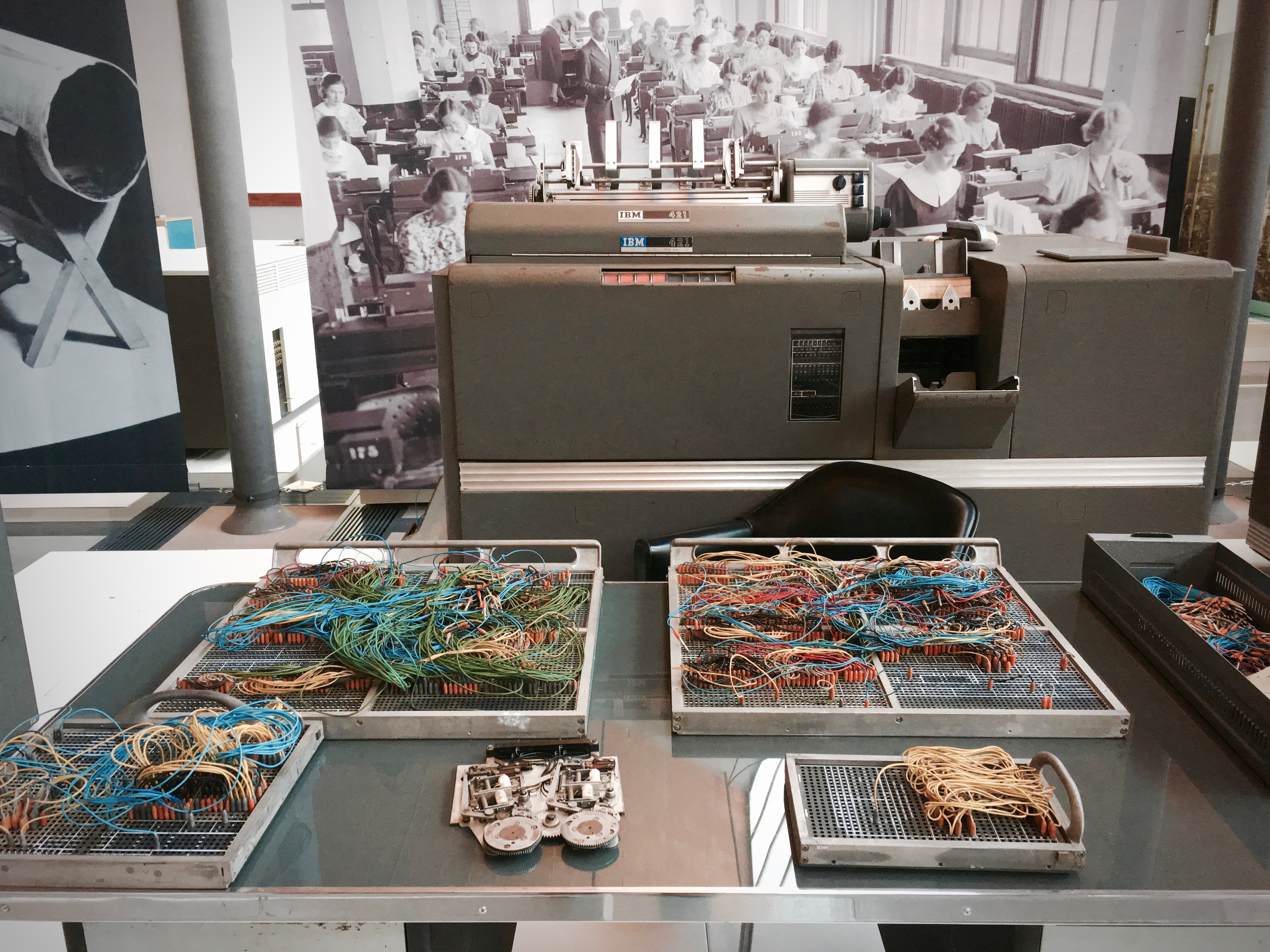
IBM 421 in mNACTEC

The IBM 421 accounting machine saw use in the 1960s.

The largely-mechanical IBM 421 read 80-column punch cards and could print upper-case letters of the alphabet, the decimal digits 0 to 9, a period (.), and plus and minus signs.

The operation of the 421 was directed by the use of a removable control panel and a carriage tape. By means of the control panel, any column of the card could be wired to any print column, by means of a wire link (the end terminals of which were manually inserted into slots in the control panel). After manual wiring, the control panel was inserted in the side of the machine, and a hand-operated lever moved the control panel so that the wire links made contact with corresponding terminals in the machine.

The 421 had 64 positions of memory, typically used to store data from a leading punch card. There were also three external program switches (Minor, Major and Super Major) that were used to alter the function of the plug board Program Selectors.

IBM 421 uses included:

1. Tabulating (listing) punch cards
2. Calculating totals
3. Calculating grand totals.

421s sold in the UK could total pre-1970 currency with twenty shillings to the pound and 12 pennies to the shilling. A UK 1964-onwards example of commercial use was 421s in multiple South Eastern Electric Board locations calculating and printing the quarterly electricity bill (in pounds, shillings and pence) for each of its thousands of customers after the 421 had read three punched cards for each customer:

1. Name and address card
2. The "old" meter reading card
3. The “new” meter reading card.

A 421 could be cable-attached to a "Summary" or "Gang Punch" (IBM 514?) to punch cards with summary totals calculated by the 421.

The printing speed was about 100 lines per minute. When calculating totals, printing was suppressed and the machine read cards faster at about 150 cards per minute.

There was one type bar for each print column. Each type bar had every character in the available set. When printing a column of a card, the type bar was raised until the desired character was in position at the current line, and then the type bar was hit by a "hammer", thus impressing the character onto the paper. The entire line was printed simultaneously (that is, all hammers struck simultaneously).

An interesting use of the machine was the evaluation of polynomials.
