= IBM 402 =

Tabulating machine introduced in 1949

IBM 402/403

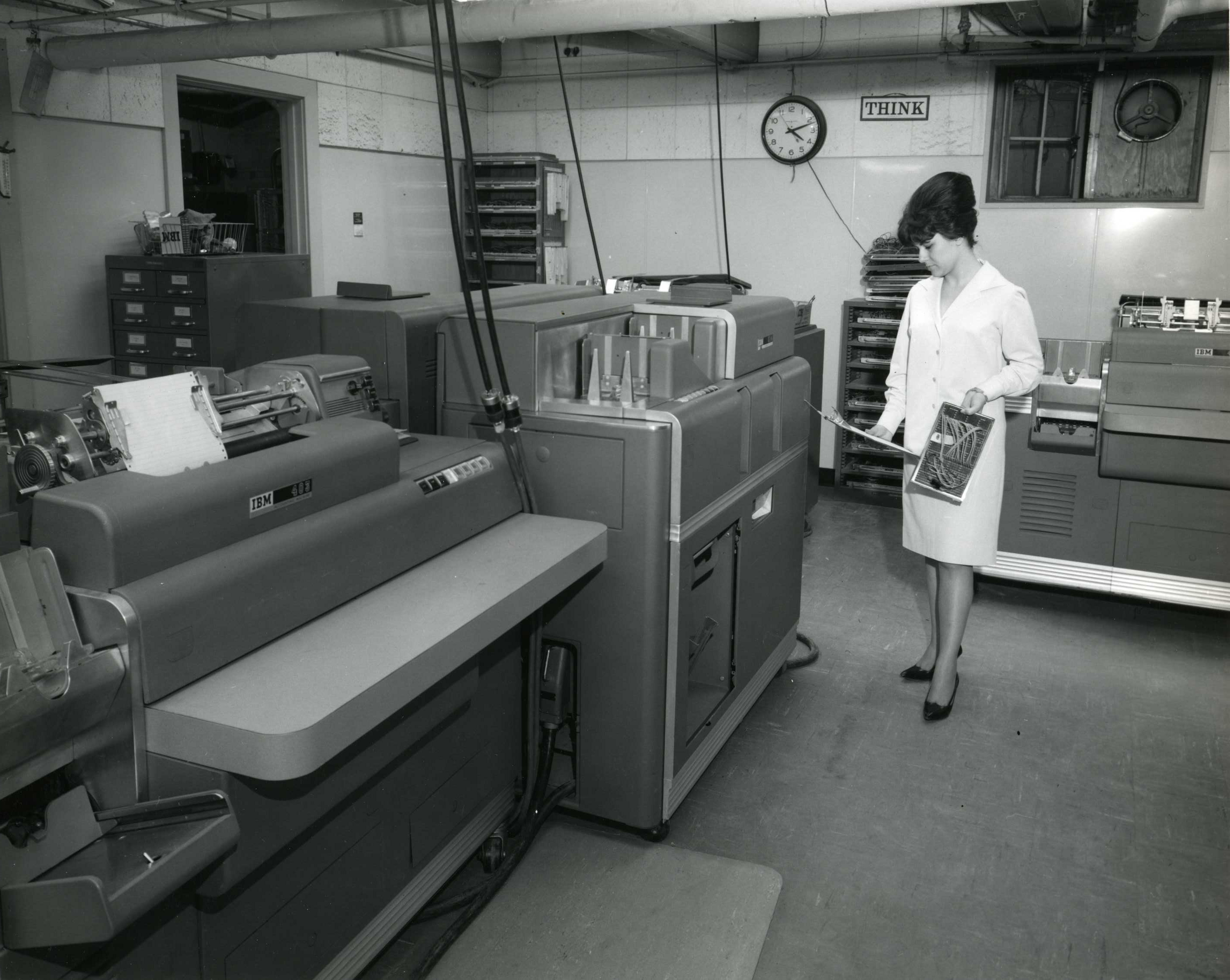
- An IBM 403 accounting machine with built-in printer (left) wired to an IBM 514 summary punch (center).
- Type: tabulating machine
- Released: 1948; 78 years ago
- Predecessor: IBM 401, IBM 405
- Related: IBM 407

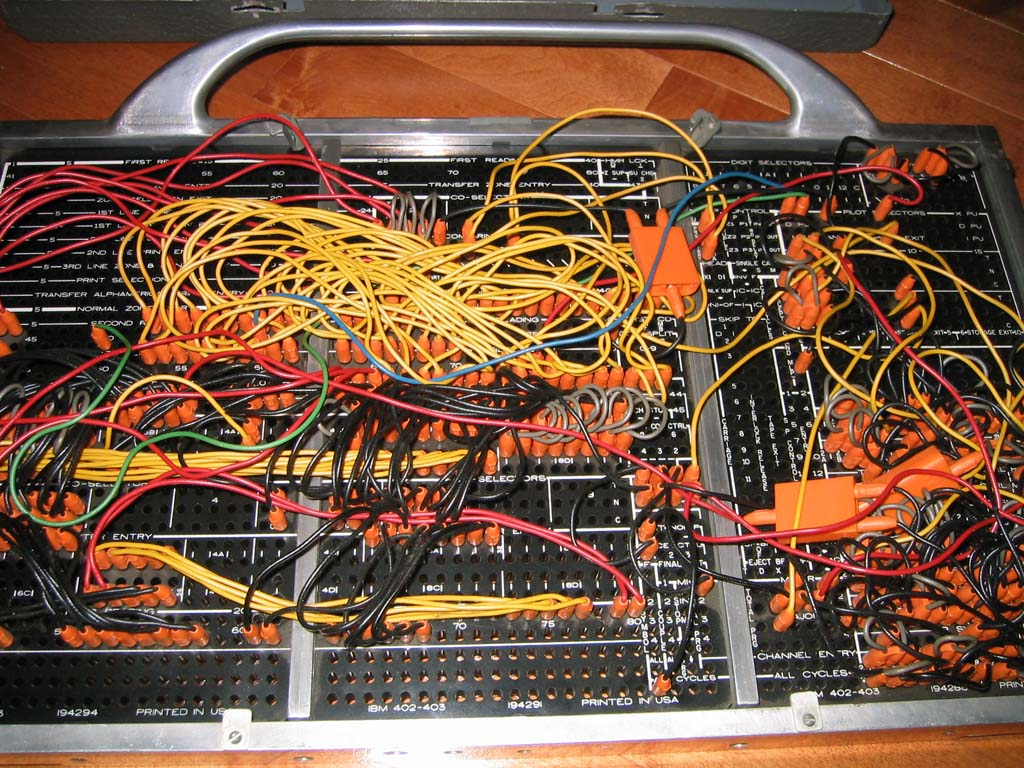
IBM 402 control panel wiring. This board was labeled "profit & loss summary."

The IBM 402 and IBM 403 Accounting Machines are tabulating machines introduced by International Business Machines in the late 1940s.

== Overview ==
The 402 can read punched cards at a speed of 80 to 150 cards per minute, depending on process options, while printing data at a speed of up to 100 lines per minute. The built-in line printer uses 43 alpha-numerical type bars (left-side) and 45 numerical type bars (right-side, shorter bars) to print a total of 88 positions across a line of a report.

The IBM 403 added the ability to print up to three lines, such as a multiline shipping address, from a single punchcard, instead of just one line per card with the 402.

The 402 and 403 are primarily controlled by a removable control panel. Additional controls include a carriage control tape and mechanical levers called hammersplits and hammerlocks, that controll some printing functions. Both the IBM 402 and IBM 403 are considered smaller models of the prior model IBM 405.

In July 2010, a group from the Computer History Museum reported that an IBM 402 was still in operation at Sparkler Filters, Inc., a manufacturing company that produces chemical filtration systems, in Conroe, Texas. As of 2022 the company's accounting and payroll is done on the oldest American computer in service within the United States of America or elsewhere on the Earth.

== See also ==
- IBM 407
- IBM 711
- Keypunch
