= Line printer =

Impact printer that prints one entire line of text at a time

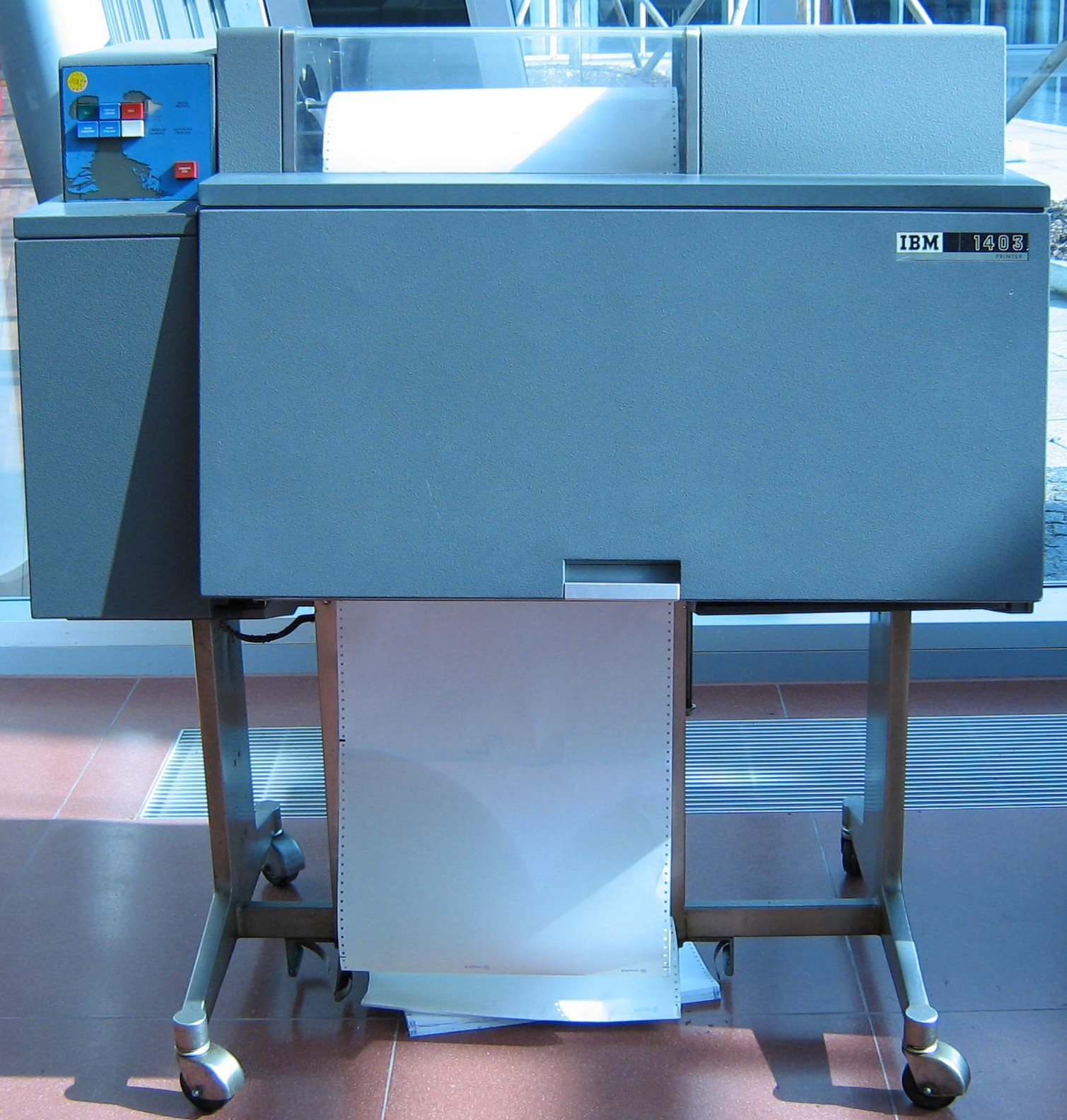
IBM 1403 line printer, the classic line printer of the mainframe era.

A line printer prints one entire line of text before advancing to another line.

Line printers are mostly associated with unit record equipment and the early days of digital computing, but the technology is still in use. Print speeds of 600 lines per minute (approximately 10 pages per minute) were achieved in the 1950s, later increasing to as much as 1200 lpm. Line printers print a complete line at a time and have speeds in the range of 150 to 2500 lines per minute.

Some types of impact line printers are drum printers, band-printers, and chain printers. Non-impact technologies have also been used, e.g., thermal line printers were popular in the 1970s and 1980s, some inkjet and laser printers produce output a line or a page at a time.

== Designs ==
Many impact printers, such as the daisywheel printer and dot matrix printer, used a print head that printed a character then moved on until an entire line was printed. Line printers were much faster, as each impact printed an entire line.

There have been five principal designs:

- Drum printers
- Chain (train) printers
- Bar printers
- Comb printers
- Wheel printers

Because all of these printing methods were noisy, line printers of all designs were enclosed in sound-absorbing cases of varying sophistication.

=== Timing-sensitive designs ===
Several designs of printers have similar characteristics.

==== Drum printer ====
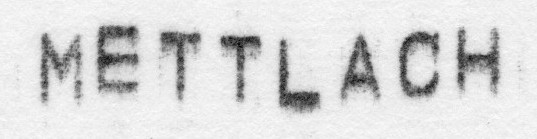
Typical print of a drum printer, showing the characteristic vertical misalignment of characters due to slight hammer timing errors (mainframe; about 1965)

In a typical drum printer design, a fixed font character set is engraved onto the periphery of a number of print wheels, the number matching the number of columns (letters in a line) the printer can print. The wheels, joined to form a large drum (cylinder), spin at high speed. Paper and an inked ribbon are stepped (moved) past the print position. As the desired character for each column passes the print position, a hammer strikes the paper from the rear and presses the paper against the ribbon and the drum, causing the desired character to be recorded on the continuous paper. Because the drum carrying the letterforms (characters) remains in constant motion, the strike-and-retreat action of the hammers has to be very fast. Typically, they are driven by voice coils mounted on the moving part of the hammer.

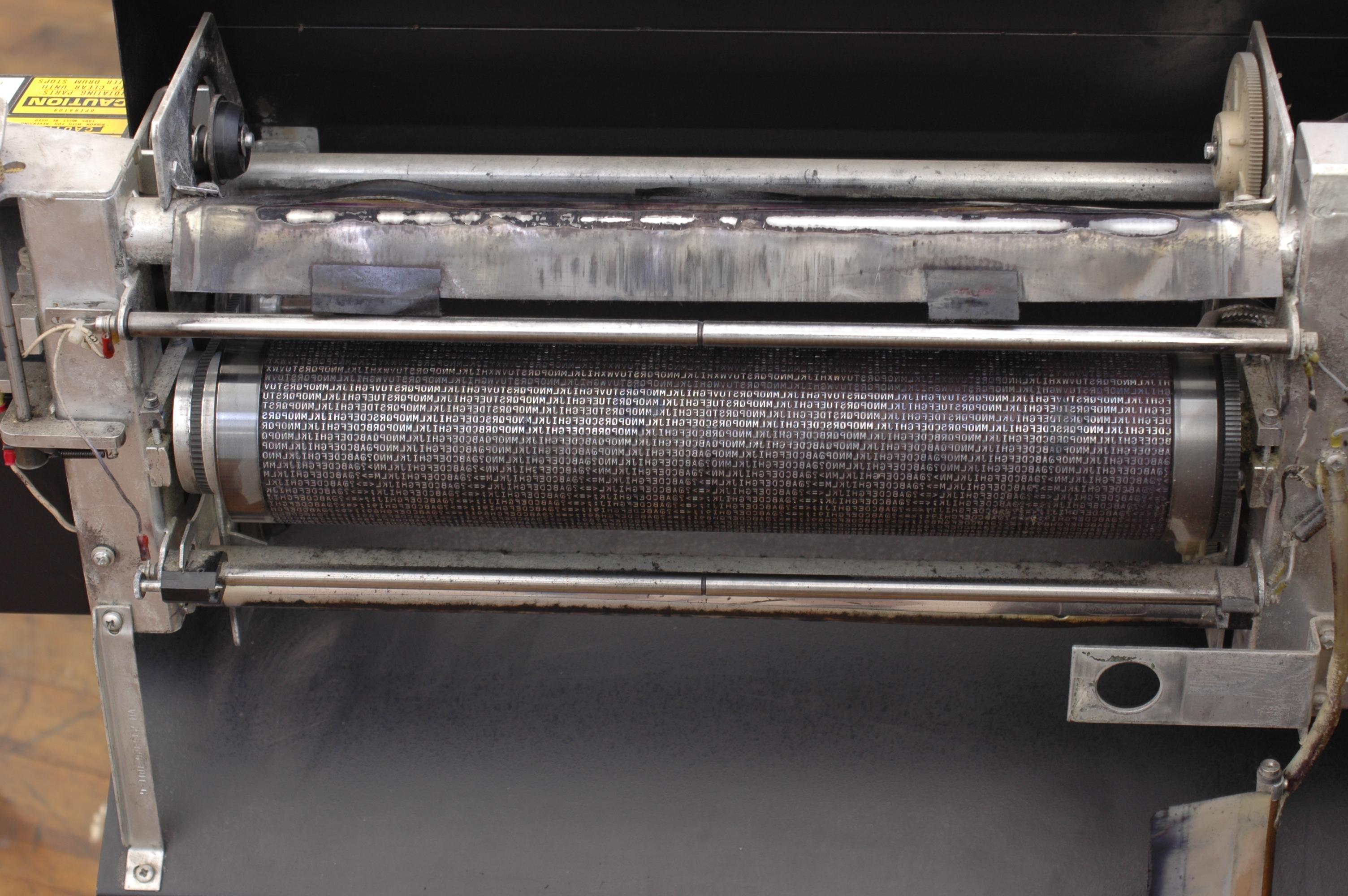
Drum printer with staggered arrangement

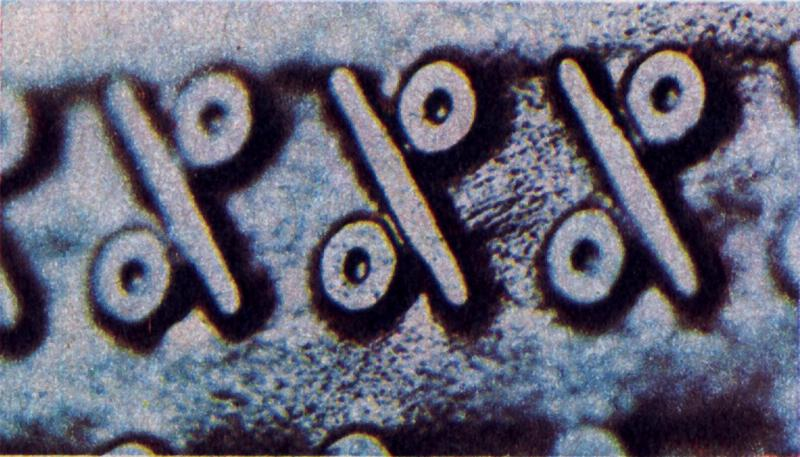
Fragment of line-printer drum showing "%" characters

Large mechanical and electric stresses occur when the line to be printed requires firing all of the hammers simultaneously. With simple type layouts, this happens when the line consists of a single character repeated in all columns, such as a line of dashes ("----...---") To avoid this problem, some printers use a staggered arrangement, with the characters in each column rotated around the drum by a different amount. Then simultaneous firing occurs only if the printed line matches the character layout on the drum, which should not happen in normal text.

Lower-cost printers do not use a hammer for each column. Instead, a hammer is provided for every other column, and the entire hammer bank is arranged to shift left and right, driven by an additional voice coil. For this style of printer, two complete revolutions of the character drum are required to print each line, with one revolution being used to print all the "odd" columns and another revolution being used to print all of the "even" columns. This requires only half (plus one) the number of hammers, magnets, and the associated channels of drive electronics.

At least one low-cost printer, made by CDC, achieves the same end by moving the paper laterally while keeping the hammer bank at rest.

Dataproducts was a typical vendor of drum printers, often selling similar models with both a full set of hammers (delivering, for example, 600 lines per minute of output) and a half set of hammers (delivering 300 LPM).

==== Printers with horizontally moving print elements ====
===== Chain printer =====
Chain printers place the type on a horizontally-moving circular chain. As with the drum printer, as the correct character passes by each column, a hammer is fired from behind the paper. Compared to drum printers, chain printers have the advantage that the type chain can usually be changed by the operator. A further advantage is that vertical registration of characters in a line is much improved over drum printers, which need extremely precise hammer timing to achieve a reasonably straight line of print. By selecting chains that have a smaller character set (for example, just numbers and a few punctuation marks), the printer can print much faster than if the chain contains the entire upper- and lower-case alphabet, numbers, and all special symbols. This is because, with many more instances of the numbers appearing in the chain, the time spent waiting for the correct character to "pass by" is greatly reduced. Common letters and symbols appear more often on the chain, according to the frequency analysis of the likely input. IBM was probably the best-known chain printer manufacturer, and the IBM 1403 is probably the most famous example of a chain printer.

===== Train printer =====
Train printers place the type on a horizontally-moving circular train of print slugs. with multiple characters per slug, on a track, The technology is almost identical to print chains.

===== Band printer =====
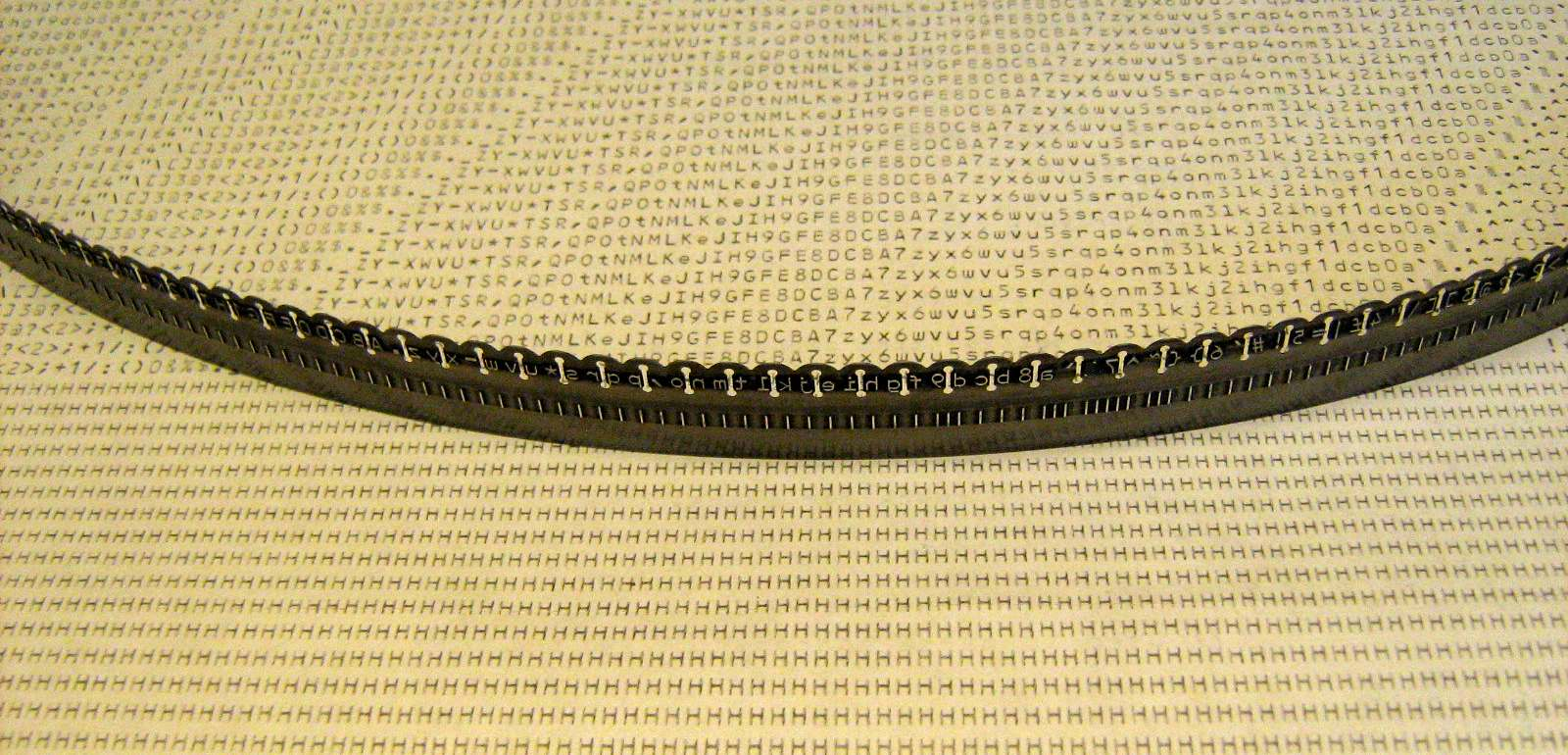
Fragment of printer band, sitting on test printout for the characters (top) and hammer flight times (bottom)

Band printers are a variation of chain printers in which a thin steel band is used instead of a chain, with the characters embossed or etched onto the band. Again, a selection of different bands are generally available with a different mix of characters so a character set best matched to the characters commonly printed can be chosen. Dataproducts was a well known manufacturer of band printers, with their B300, B600, and B1000 range, the model number representing the lines per minute rate of the printer. (The B300 is effectively a B600 with only half the number of hammers—one per two character positions. The hammer bank moves back and forth one character position, increasing the average number of band movements required for each line.)

===== Bar printer =====
Bar printers were similar to chain printers but were slower and less expensive. Rather than a chain moving continuously in one direction, the characters were on fingers mounted on a bar that moved left-to-right and then right-to-left in front of the paper. An example was the IBM 1443.

===== Common characteristics =====
In all four designs, timing of the hammers (the so-called "flight time") was critical, and was adjustable as part of the servicing of the printer. For drum printers, incorrect timing of the hammer resulted in printed lines that wandered vertically, albeit with characters correctly aligned horizontally in their columns. For train and bar printers, incorrect timing of the hammers resulted in characters shifting horizontally, printed closer or farther from the next character, or blurred on one side, albeit on vertically-level printed lines. The vertical misalignment of drum printers is more noticeable and annoying to human vision (see the sample pictured in this article).

Most drum, chain, and bar printers were capable of printing up to 132 columns, but a few designs could only print 80 columns and some other designs as many as 160 columns.

=== Comb printer ===
Comb printers, also called line matrix printers, printed a matrix of dots instead of individual characters in the same way as single-character dot matrix printers, but using a comb of hammers to print a portion of an entire row of pixels at one time (for example, every eighth pixel). By oscillating the comb or "print shuttle" left and right a short distance, the entire pixel row could be printed (continuing the example, in eight cycles). The paper then advanced and the next pixel row was printed. Because far less print head motion was involved than in a conventional dot matrix printer, these printers were much faster, and competitive in speed with formed-character line printers without being restricted to a set of available characters, thus being able to print dot-matrix graphics and variable-sized characters.

Printronix and TallyGenicom are well-known vendors of comb printers. In 2009, TallyGenicom was acquired by Printronix.

=== Wheel printers ===
In 1949 IBM introduced the IBM 407 Accounting Machine with a wheel print mechanism that could print 150 alphanumeric lines a minute. Each of the 120 print positions had its own type wheel which rotated under electromechanical control. Once all were in position, print hammers struck the wheels against a ribbon and the paper. The 407 or its wheel line printer mechanism was attached to a variety of early IBM computers, including the IBM 650, most members of the IBM 700/7000 series and the IBM 1130, the last introduced in 1965.

== Paper (forms) handling ==
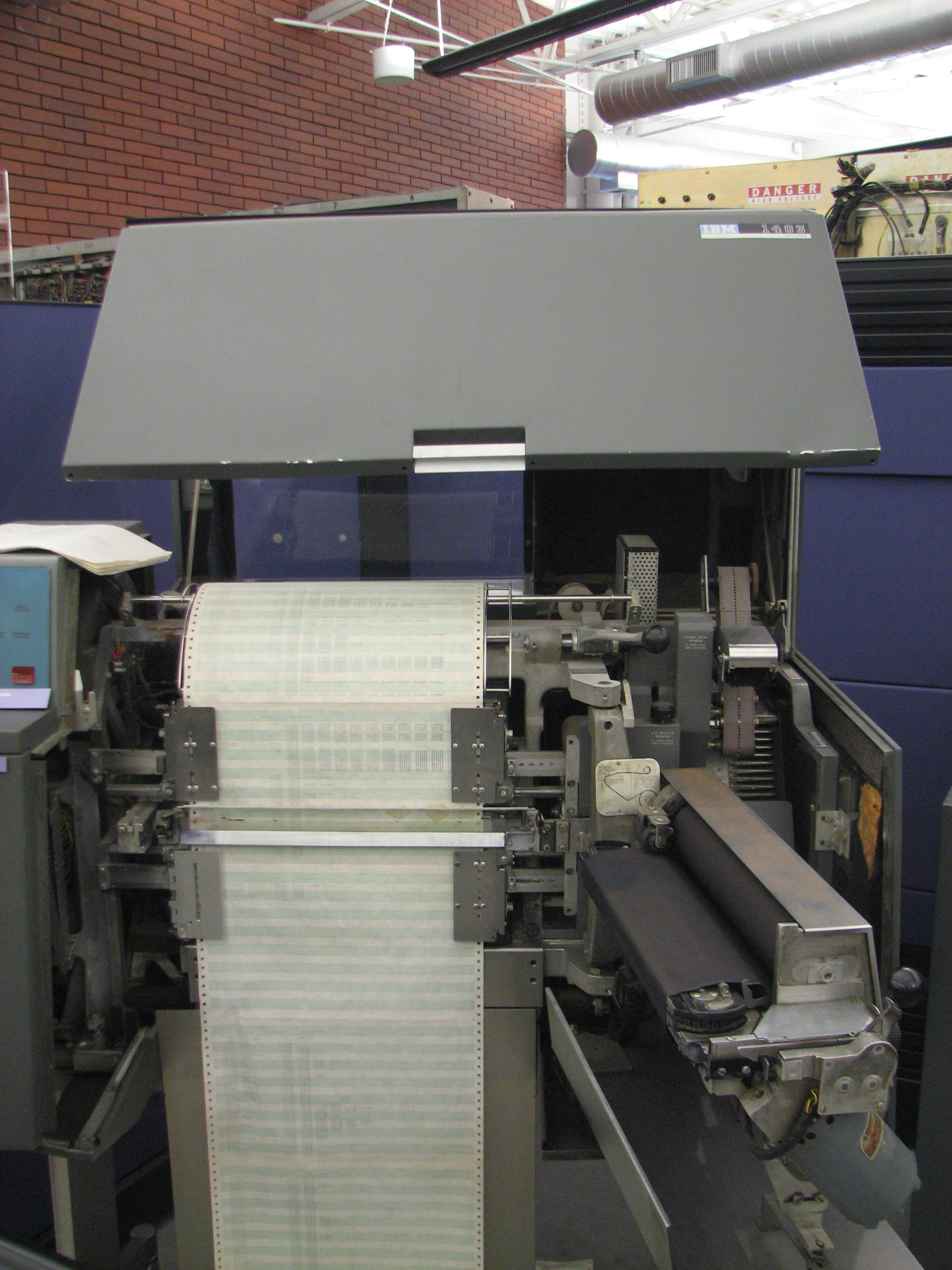
An IBM 1403 printer opened up as it would be to change paper. Note the form tractors on each side of the paper, and the carriage control tape in upper right. The print chain is covered by a full-width ink ribbon, see lower right: The hinged chain-and-ribbon assembly is here swung open towards the camera like a gate.

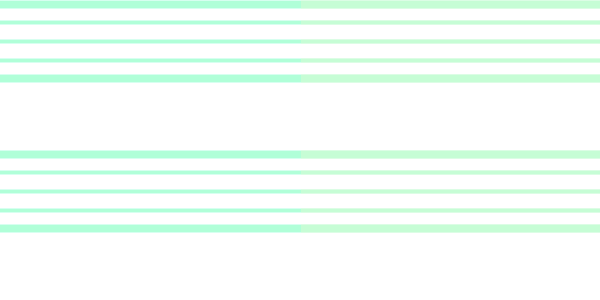
Green-zebra-paper

All line printers used continuous form paper provided in boxes of continuous fan-fold forms rather than cut-sheets. The paper was usually perforated to tear into cut sheets if desired and was commonly printed with alternating white and light-green areas, allowing the reader to easily follow a line of text across the page. This was the iconic "green bar", "blue bar" or "music-ruled" form paper that dominated the early computer age in several variants. Standard "green bar" page sizes included portrait-format pages of 8½ × 11 inches (letter size), usually printed at 80 columns by 66 lines of characters (at 6 lines per inch) or 88 lines (at 8 LPI), and landscape-format pages of 14 × 11 inches, usually printed at 132 columns by 66 or 88 lines. Also common were landscape-format pages of 14 × 8½ inches (legal size), allowing for 132 columns by 66 lines (at 8 LPI) on a more compact page.

Pre-printed forms were also commonly used (for printing cheques, invoices, etc.). A common task for the system operator was to change from one paper form to another as one print job completed and another was to begin. Some line printers had covers that opened automatically when the printer required attention. These continuous forms were advanced through the printer by means of tractors (sprockets or sprocket belts). Depending on the sophistication of the printer, there might simply be two tractors at the top of the printer (pulling the paper) or tractors at the top and bottom (thereby maintaining paper tension within the printer). The horizontal position of the tractors was usually adjustable to accommodate different forms. The earliest printers by IBM used a hydraulic motor to move the forms. In later line printers, high-speed servomechanisms usually drove the tractors, allowing very rapid positioning of the paper, both for advancing line-by-line and slewing to the top of the next form. The faster line printers, of necessity, also used "stackers" to re-fold and stack the fan-fold forms as they emerged from the printer.

The high-speed motion of the paper often developed large electrostatic charges. Line printers frequently used a variety of discharge brushes and active (corona discharge-based) static eliminators to discharge these accumulated charges.

Many printers supported ASA carriage control characters which provided a limited degree of control over the paper, by specifying how far to advance the paper between printed lines. Various means of providing vertical tabulation were provided, ranging from a paper carriage control tape loop to fully electronic (software-controllable) tab simulation.

== Origins ==
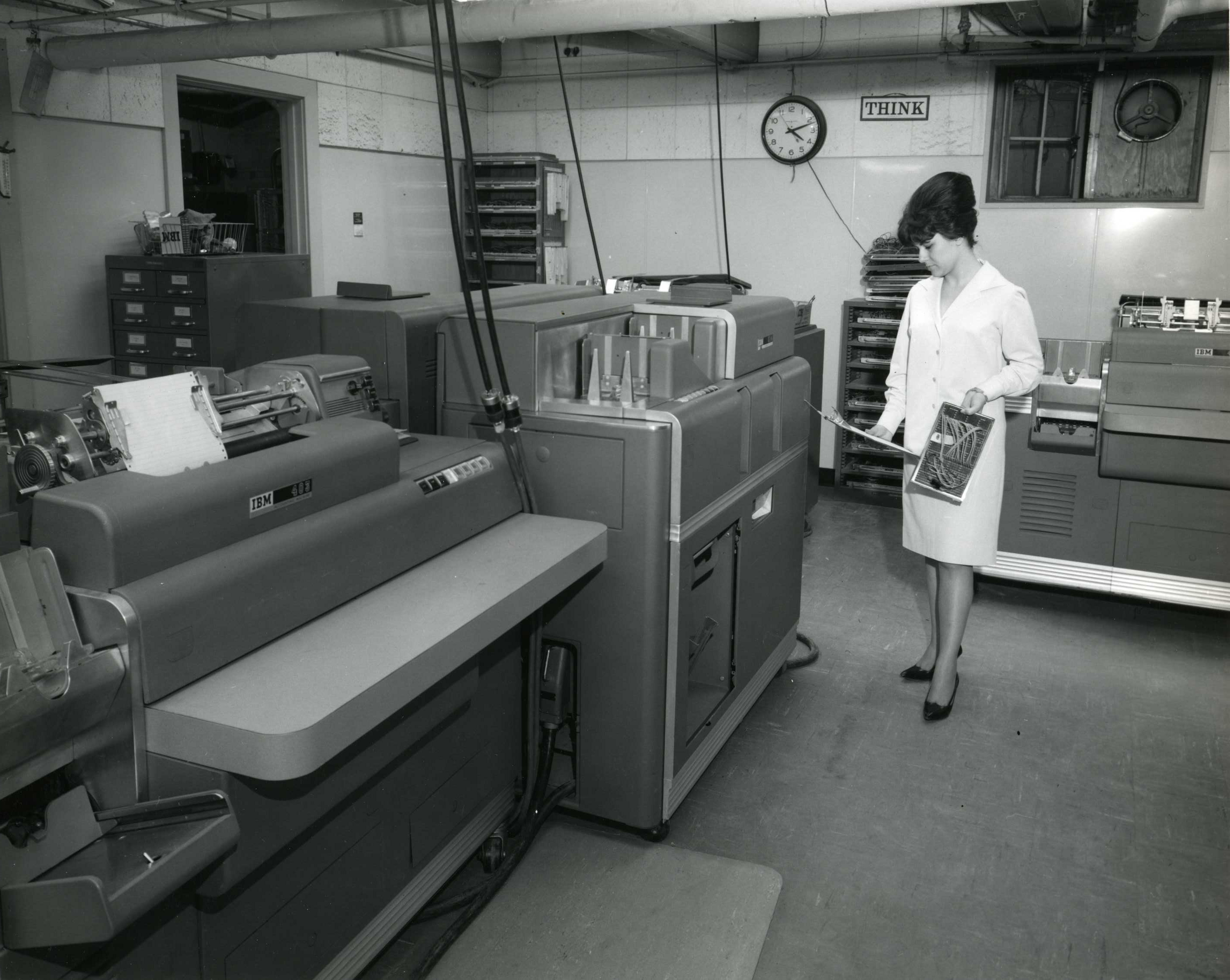
A type bar line printer was incorporated in the IBM 402 and 403 accounting machines.

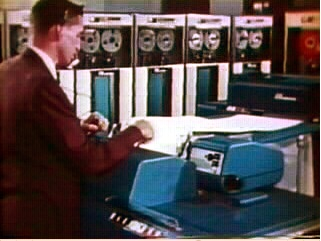
An IBM 716 line printer, based on the IBM 407 wheel mechanism, attached to an IBM 7090 mainframe at NASA's Goddard Spaceflight Center during Project Mercury.

Tabulators built by the U.S. Census Bureau for the 1910 census could print their results. Prior to that, tabulator operators had to write down totals from counter wheels onto tally sheets. IBM developed a series of printing accounting machines, beginning in 1920. The 285 Numeric Printing Tabulator could read 150 cards per minute. The 405, introduced in 1934, could print at 80 lines per minute. It had 88 type bars, one for each print position, with 43 alphanumeric bars on the left, followed by 45 numeric-only bars. The IBM 402 series, introduced after World War II, had a similar print arrangement and was used by IBM in early computing devices, including the IBM Card-Programmed Electronic Calculator.

IBM's first commercial computer, the IBM 701, introduced in 1952, used a line printer, the IBM 716, that was based on the type wheel IBM 407 accounting machine. The 716 was incorporated in subsequent mainstream computers in the IBM 700/7000 series.

An early drum printer was the "Potter Flying Typewriter", in 1952. "Instead of working laboriously, one character at a time, it prints whole lines at once, 300 lines per minute, on a paper band. ... Heart of the machine is a continuously spinning disk with the necessary letters and numbers on its rim. ... As the disk revolves, 80 electrically operated hammers tap the back of the paper against an inked ribbon in contact with the disk, thus printing the proper characters in the proper places on the line."

== Influence on hardware and software ==
The names of the lp and lpr commands in Unix were derived from the term "line printer". Analogously, many other systems call their printing devices "LP", "LPT", or some similar variant, whether these devices are in fact line printers or other types of printers. These references served to distinguish formatted final output from normal interactive output from the system, which in many cases in line printer days was also printed on paper (as by a teletype) but not by a line printer. Line printers printed characters, letters and numbers line by line. The parallel ports of computers so equipped were usually designated LPTx, for line printer.

== See also ==
- IBM Machine Code Printer Control Characters
- Characters per line
- lp0 on fire
- Page printer
- Typewriter
- Edgeline printing
