= Carriage control tape =

Loop of punched tape used to synchronize fast vertical page motion in line printers

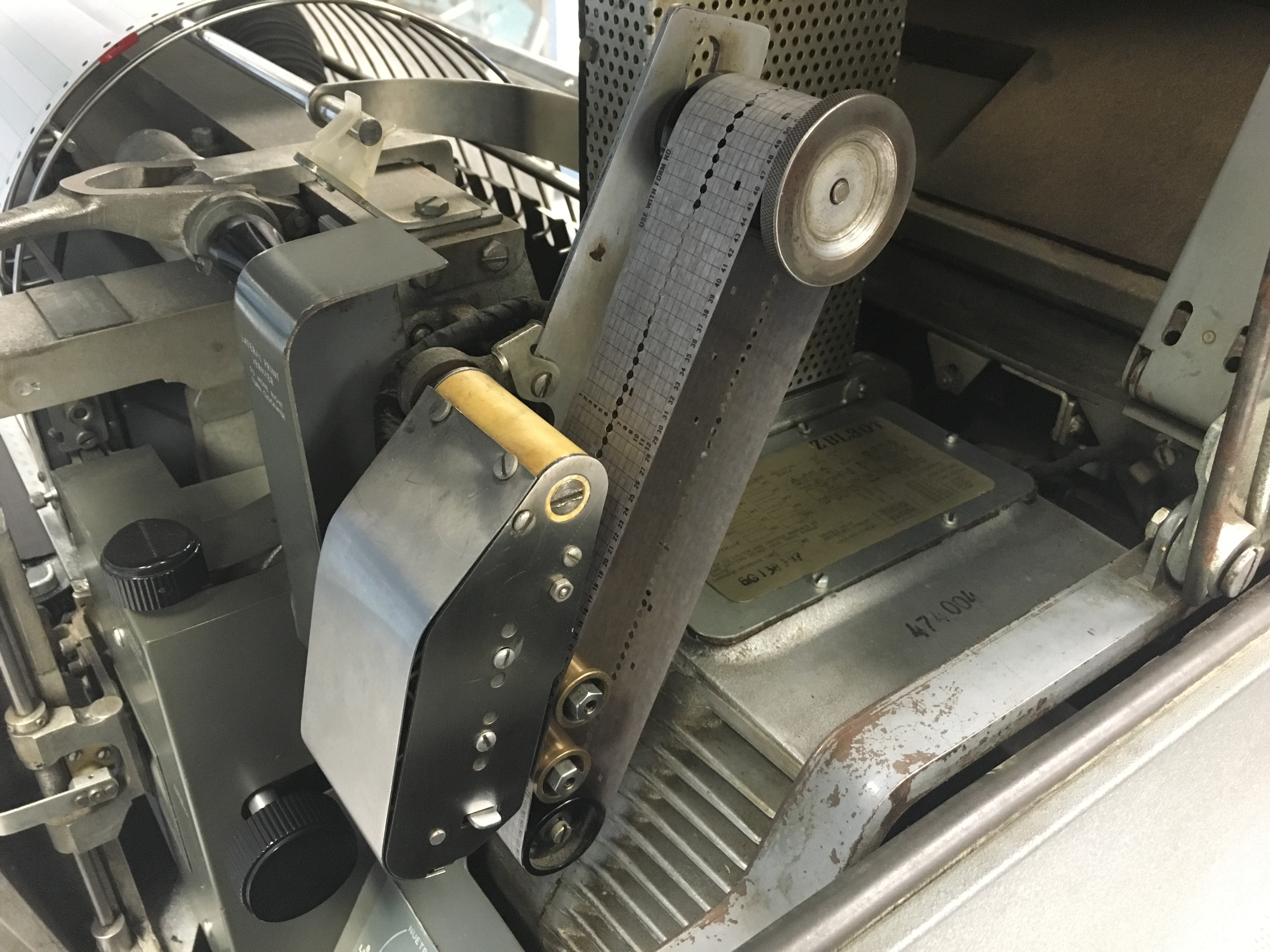
Carriage control tape on an IBM 1403 printer. One channel punch is visible in this photo.

A carriage control tape was a loop of punched tape that was used to synchronize rapid vertical page movement in most IBM and many other line printers from unit record days through the 1960s. They were used in the IBM 407 and 402 accounting machines, which were introduced in 1949, and on later printers through the 1960s, e.g., IBM 1403, Honeywell 822.

The tape loop was as long as the length of a single page. A pin wheel moved the tape accurately using holes in the center of the tape. A hole punched in one of the other channels represented a particular position on the page. Channel one was typically used to indicate the top of the page and might be the only channel used. Another channel might indicate the summary line on an invoice, enabling rapid skipping to that line. IBM provides a special manual punch that allowed accurate placement of the channel punches. Skipping occurred under computer control, but a form feed switch on the printer control panel allowed a manual skip to the top of the page. The tapes could be easily changed when new, continuously fed forms were loaded into the printer.

== Forms control buffer ==
Newer printers starting with the 3211 use a "forms control buffer" (FCB), which is an electronic image of the physical carriage control tape. A job can request a specific FCB for a printout, and it will be loaded before printing is started, eliminating operator intervention.

== Conventions ==
Conventionally, channel 1 indicates the top of the form (the first printable line on a page, often but not necessarily the first line of the page), and a new form is started with a "skip to channel 1" command (skipping is much faster than line spacing). Channel 9 is positioned a few lines above the end of the page, so a system that could sense the printer status while printing would, for example, have room to print a page footer or totals. Channel 12 indicates the last printable line of the form. These are only conventions, however, and applications are free to establish their own standards.

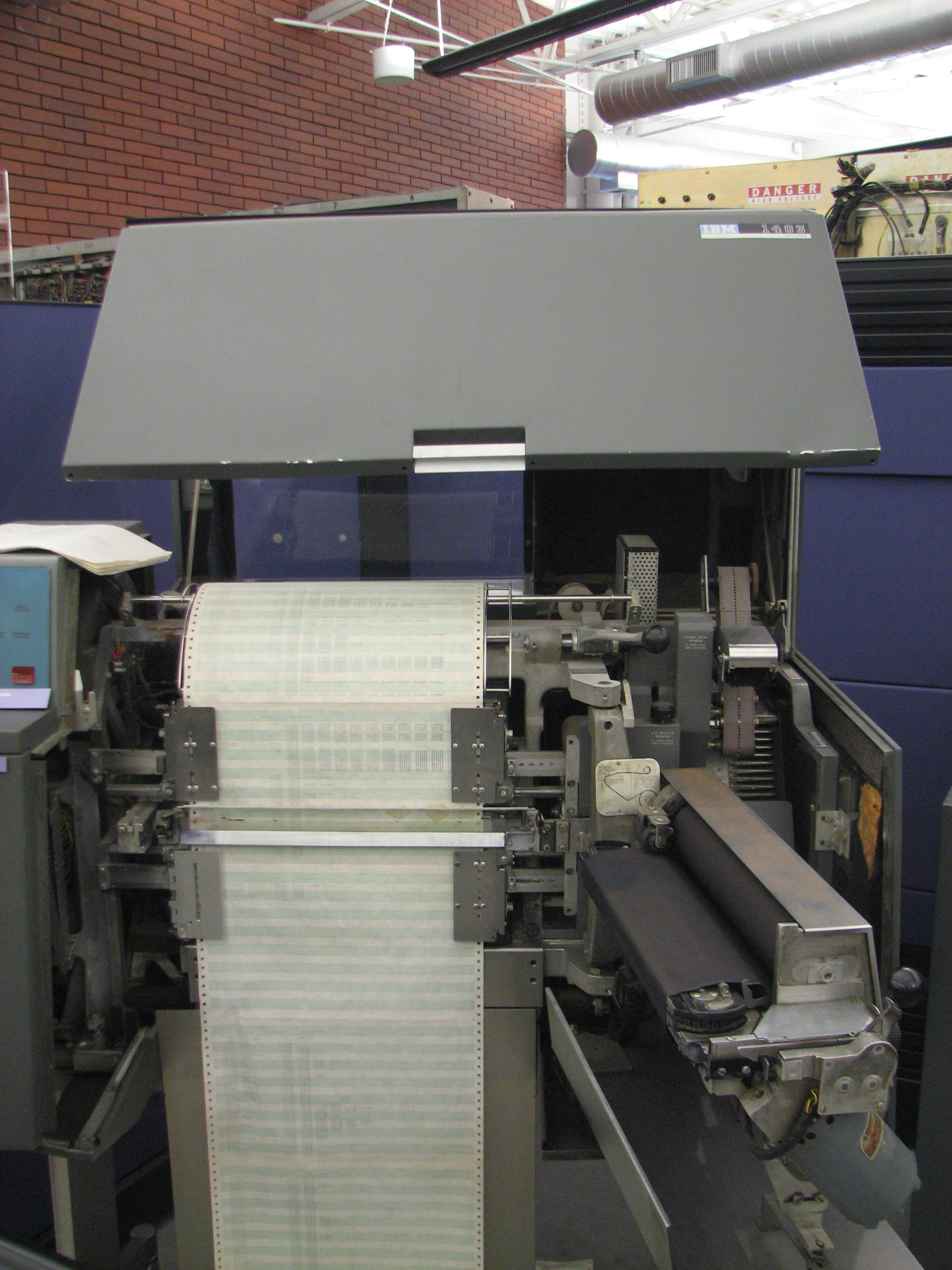
IBM 1403 printer opened up as it would be to change paper. Note carriage control tape in upper right.

Side view of opened up IBM 1403 printer.

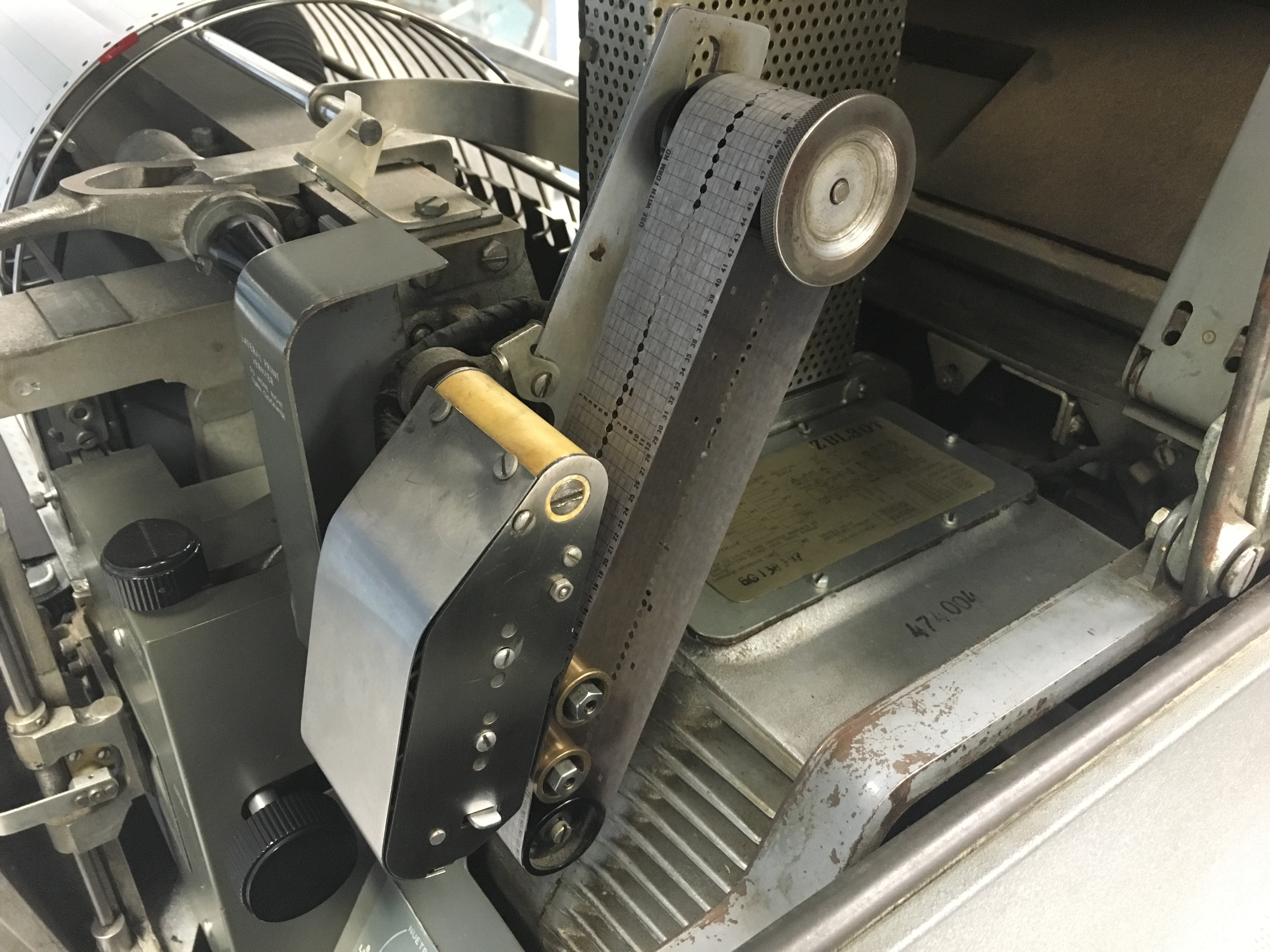
Close up of carriage control tape. Note control punches.

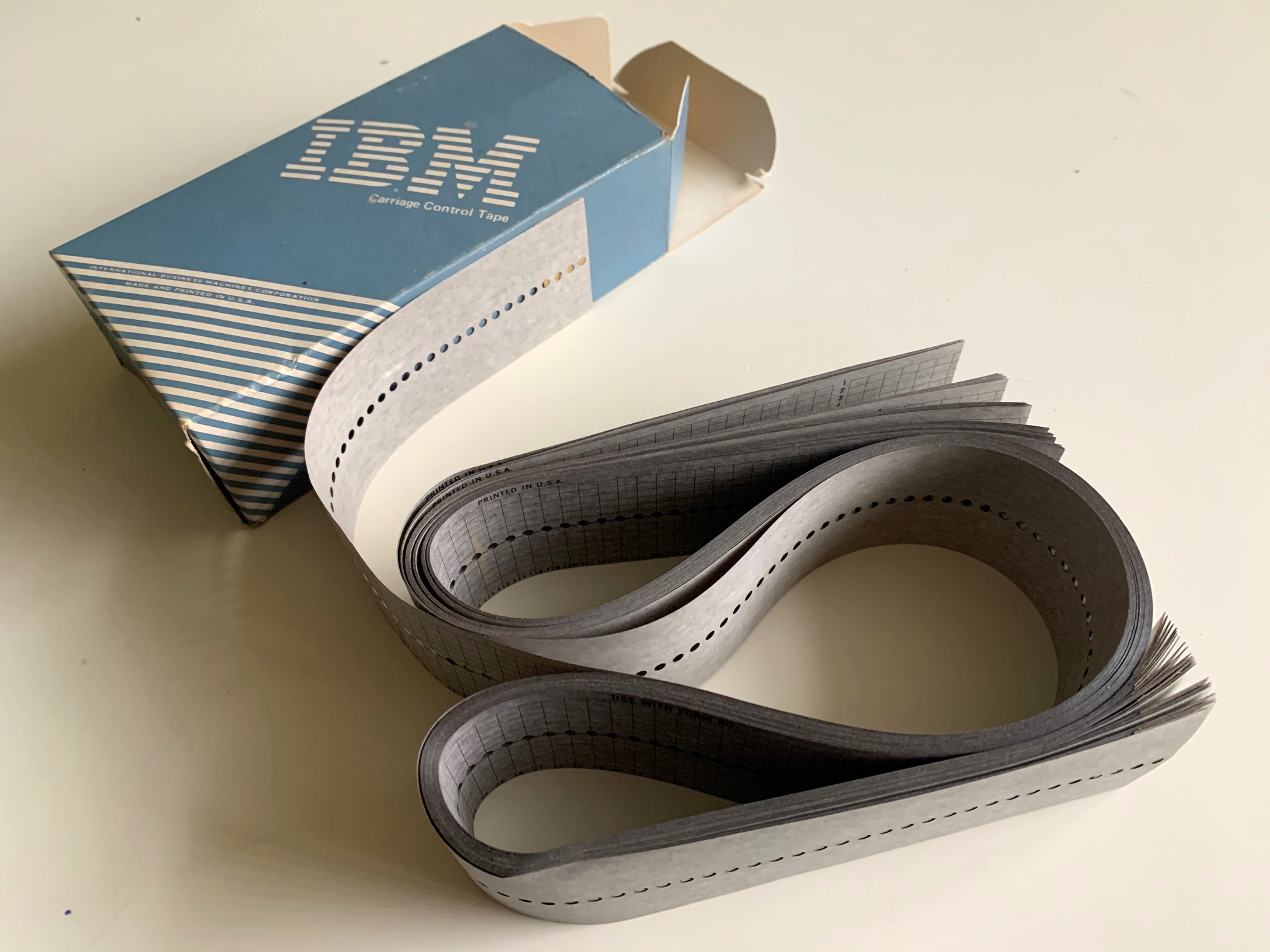
New tapes before punching and 'looping'. Usually supplied in boxes of 25 as shown.

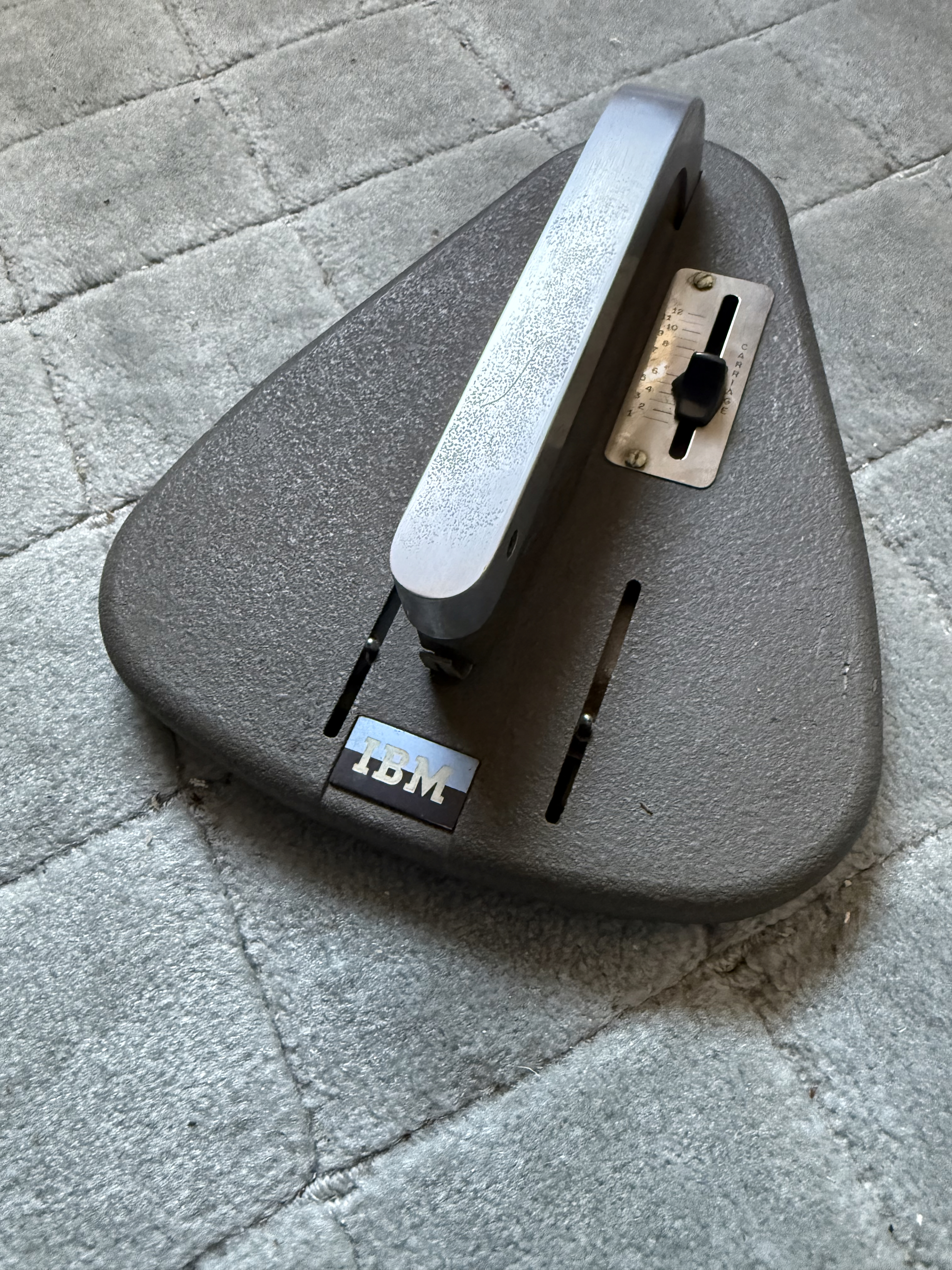
IBM Carriage Control Tape Punch

== Sources ==
- IBM 407 manual p.129 ff
- Excerpt on printing from IBM 1130 manual
- Rack for holding carriage tapes at Computer History Museum
- U.S. patent 3,094,261
