= IBM 602 =

1946 electromechanical calculator

- Type: Electromechanical calculator
- Released: 1946; 80 years ago
- Predecessor: IBM 601
- Successor: IBM CPC with IBM 604 computing unit
- Related: IBM 603

The IBM 602 Calculating Punch, introduced in 1946, is an electromechanical calculator capable of addition, subtraction, multiplication, and division. The 602 was IBM's first machine that did division. (The IBM 601, introduced in 1931, only multiplied.) Like other IBM calculators, it is programmed using a control panel. Input data is read from a punched card, the results can be punched in the same card or a trailing card.

The 602 was available in four models: Model 1, Model 2, Model 50, and Model 51. The "Series 50" models were low-cost versions that ran at a slower speed, with half as many program steps, and fewer storage registers and counters.

| Model | Machine Cycles per Minute | Program Steps | 12-Digit Storage Units | 6-Digit Counters | 4-Digit Counters | Functions |
|---|---|---|---|---|---|---|
| 1 | 200 | 12 | 6 | 3 | 3 | +, -, *, / |
| 2 | 200 | 12 | 6 | 3 | 3 | +, -, *, / |
| 50 | 150 | 6 | 4 | 3 | 1 | +, -, *, / |
| 51 | 150 | 6 | 4 | 3 | 1 | +, -, * |

Two additional counters were available as an optional feature.

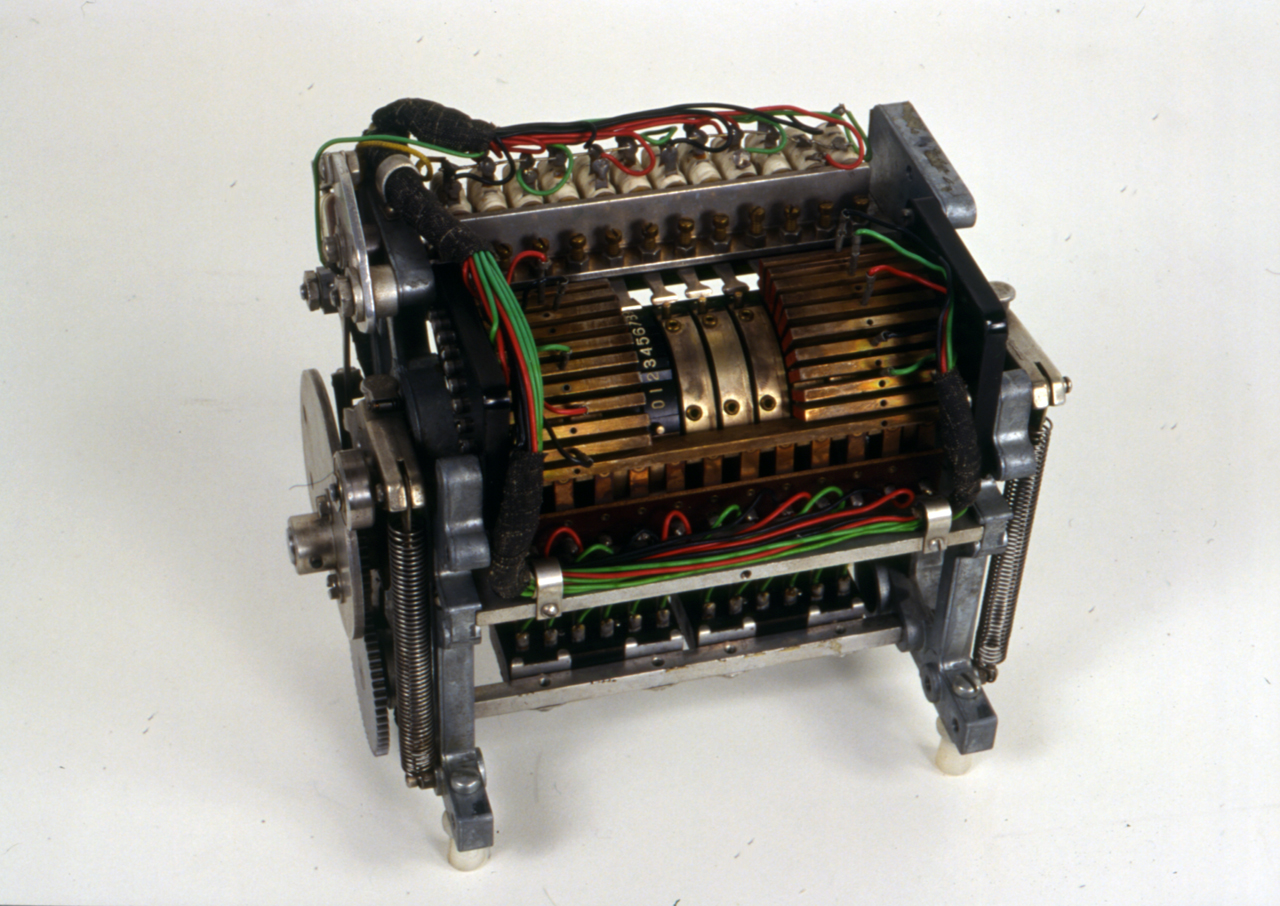
Electromechanical memory module from IBM 602 machine

Program steps execute in one machine cycle, except for steps performing multiplication or division which take as many machine cycles as needed for the operation. Punching rate is roughly four columns per machine cycle. The total number of machine cycles required per card varies depending on the data and programming.

Programming the 602 for each problem involved two things:

1. A control panel wired for the sequence of the calculation
2. A Skip Bar with "inserts" placed for the first column of each field to punch

== See also ==
- IBM 603
- IBM CPC
  - IBM 604
  - IBM 605
- IBM 608
