= IBM 601 =

1931 unit record machine that could multiply

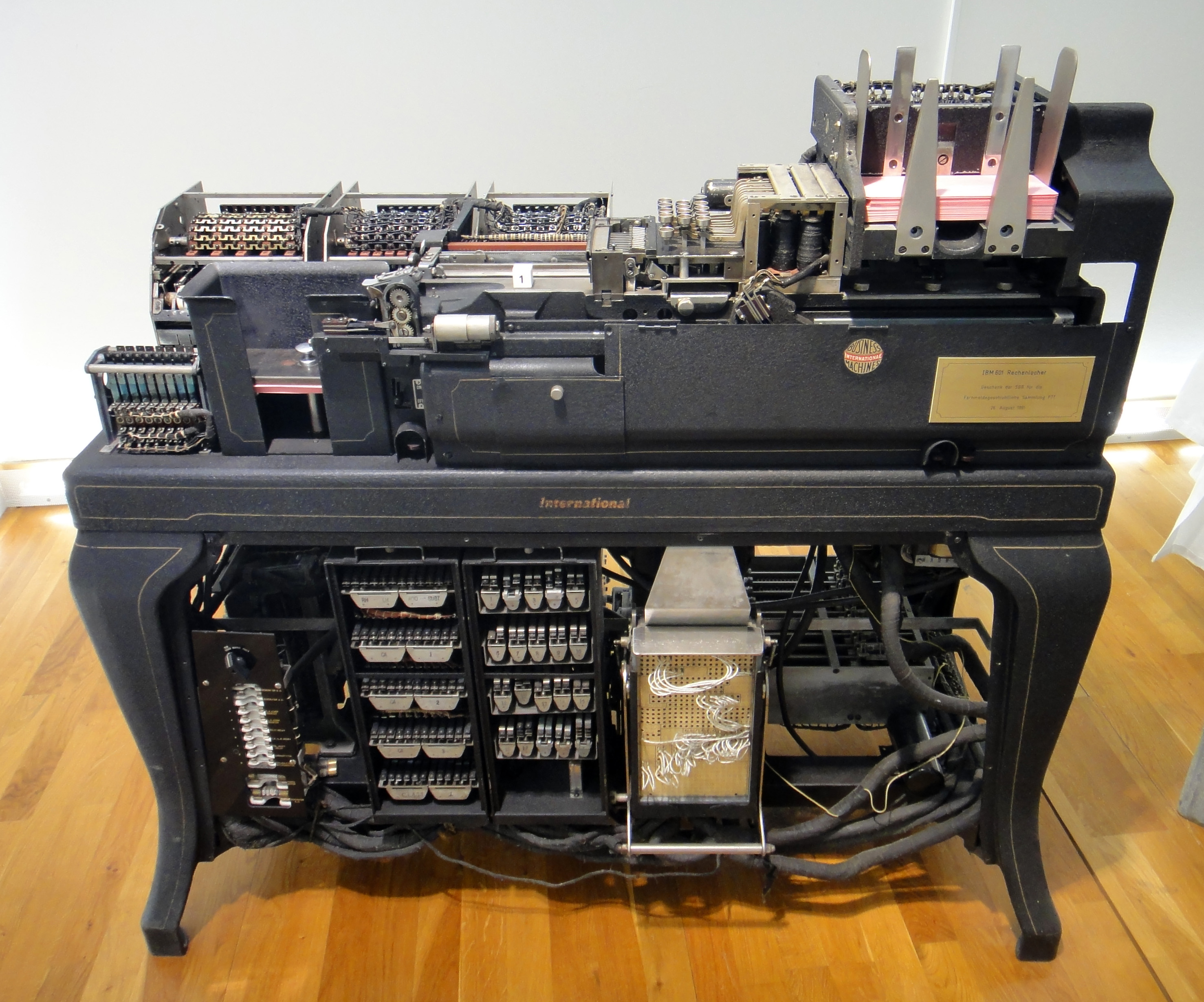
- IBM 601 Multiplying Punch
- Type: Electromechanical calculator
- Released: 1931; 95 years ago
- Successor: IBM 602 (electromechanical); IBM 603 (vacuum tube)

The IBM 601 Multiplying Punch is a unit record machine that can read two numbers from a punched card and punch their product in a blank field on the same card. The factors can be up to eight decimal digits long. The 601 was introduced in 1931 and was the first IBM machine that could do multiplication.

In 1936 W. J. Eckert connected a modified 601 to a 285 tabulator and an 016 duplicating punch through a custom switch he designed and used the combined setup to perform scientific calculations.

== See also ==
- IBM 602
- IBM 603
- IBM 604
