= Powers Accounting Machine =

Early 20th-century tabulating machine

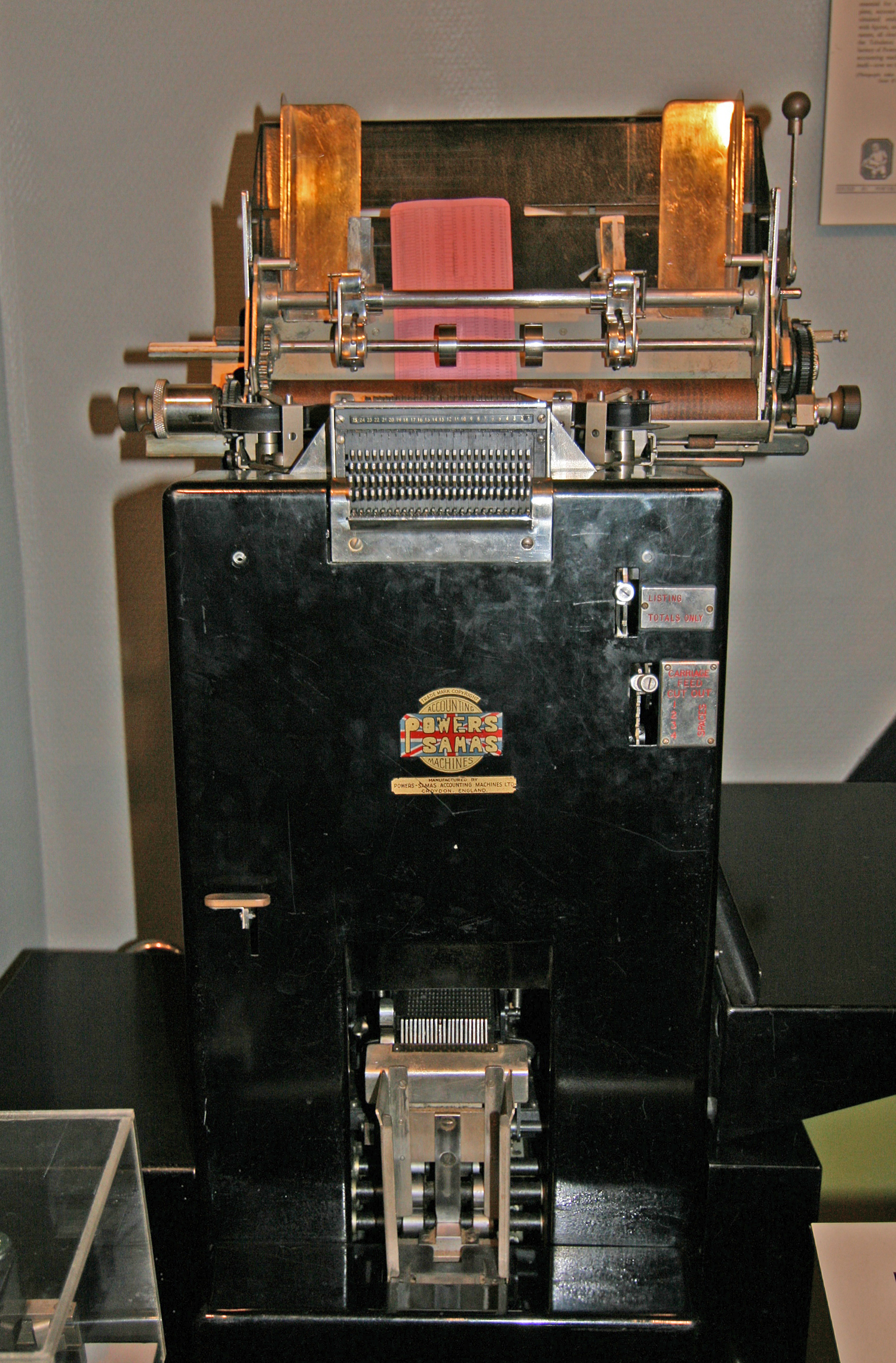
A Powers-Samas accounting machine

The Powers Accounting Machine was an information processing device developed in the early 20th century for the U.S. Census Bureau. It was then produced and marketed by the Powers Accounting Machine Company, an information technology company founded by the machine's developer. The company thrived in the early 20th century as a producer of tabulating machines. It was a predecessor to the Unisys corporation.

== Development ==
=== Census Bureau ===
In 1890, the government began leasing tabulating machines from Herman Hollerith's Tabulating Machine Company, to more efficiently, expansively, and accurately produce the national census. In 1900, Hollerith raised the lease pricing. This led the newly formed U.S. Census Bureau to seek other suppliers under its new director, Simon North, in 1903. North returned most of Hollerith's machines, and the Census Bureau began using Charles F. Pidgin's tabulators. These machines proved too slow, so the Bureau undertook to develop its own machine for the 1910 census. North secured a $40,000 appropriation for the project.

=== James Powers ===
James Legrand Powers was a mechanical engineer. He was born in Odessa, Russia, in 1871, and graduated from the Technical School of Odessa. He emigrated to the United States in 1889.

The Census Bureau hired him as a technician in 1907 to help develop the competing tabulating machine. He had already done early experimental work in office machines, and had several patents to his name.

Although Hollerith had numerous patents for his tabulators, Powers managed to avoid infringement, by using mechanical sensors on the punch readers, instead of electrical sensors. The new machine was faster, cheaper, more accurate, less error-prone, and less wasteful than Hollerith's or Pidgin's, while maintaining compatibility with Hollerith's punched card format. The key advantages of the new machine were feeder mechanisms, and the "whole card punch," an improvement over the character-by-character punch of earlier designs. A second machine was also developed by W. W. Lasker, to automate printing results.

Powers secured a patent for his version of the tabulating machine, which allowed him to later create a business around the technology he had invented.

A prolific inventor, he did not restrict himself to office machinery. See, for example, the Germproof Drinking Cup. The inventor was a member of the Machinery Club and the American Society of Mechanical Engineering through the time of his death on Tuesday, November 8, 1927, at age 57. The New York Times ran a brief paid obituary two days later.

=== First usage ===
The United States Census Bureau tested the machine in the real world by allowing the Cuban government to conduct its census in 1908-1909 using prototypes of the new tabulating machine.

== Corporate ==
After successful use in the 1910 census, Mr. Powers formed a corporation to manufacture his machines and sell them commercially. The company was founded in 1911 in Newark, New Jersey. In 1914, he moved to Brooklyn, New York. Originally known as Powers Tabulating Machine Company, the name was changed to Powers Accounting Machine Company to better target a broad scope of market.

In 1927 the Remington Typewriter Company and the Rand Kardex Corporation merged, forming Remington Rand Inc. Within a year Remington Rand acquired the Powers Accounting Machine Company.

In Europe, Powers established European operations in 1915 through the Accounting and Tabulating Machine Company of Great Britain Limited, and in 1929 renamed to Powers-Samas Accounting Machine Limited (Samas, full name Société Anonyme des Machines à Statistiques, had been the Power's sales agency in France).

== See also ==
- Punched card
- Unit record equipment
