= Powers-Samas =

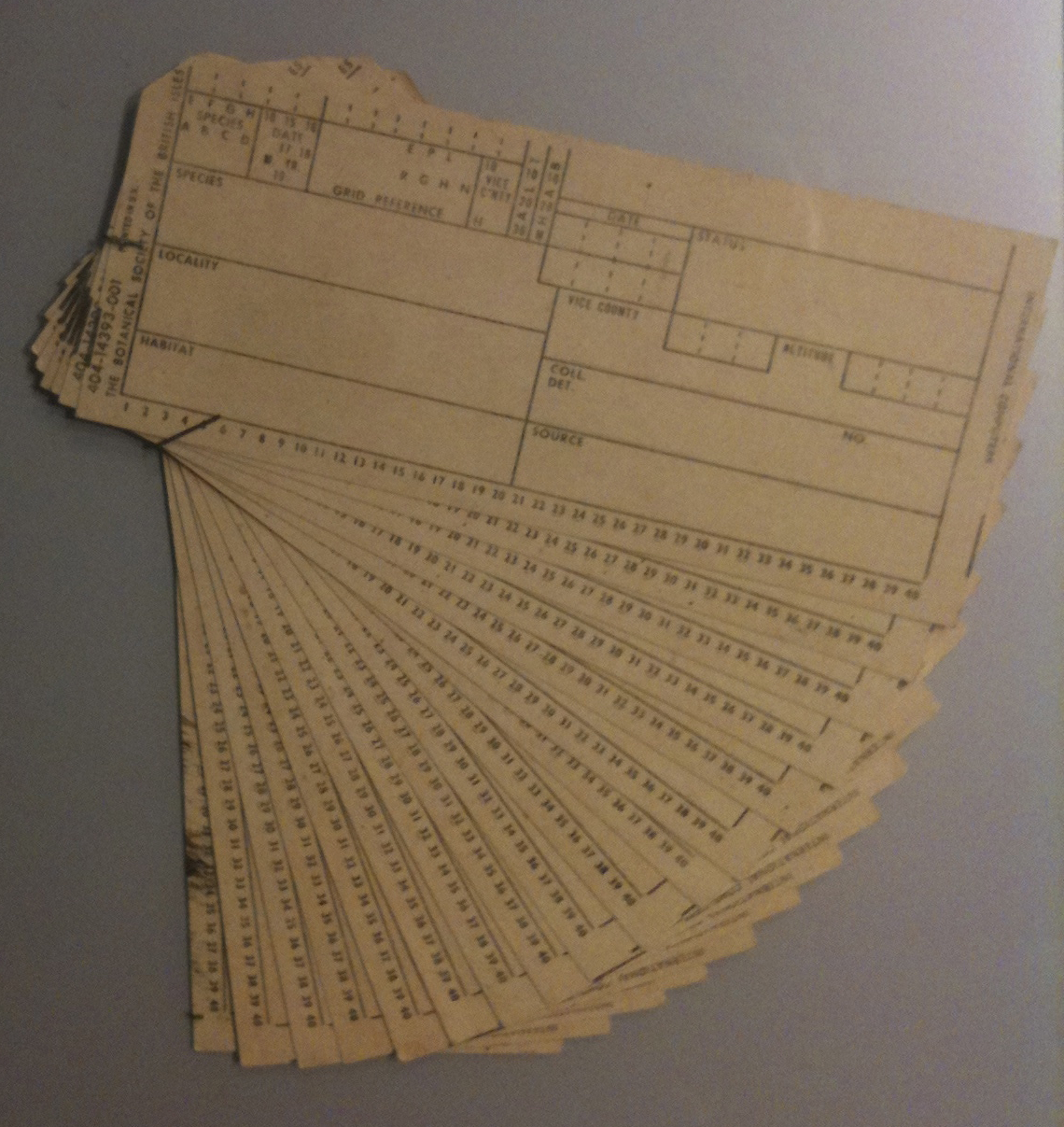
Blank pre-printed 40-column Powers-Samas cards, as used by the Botanical Society of the British Isles to store information on plant species

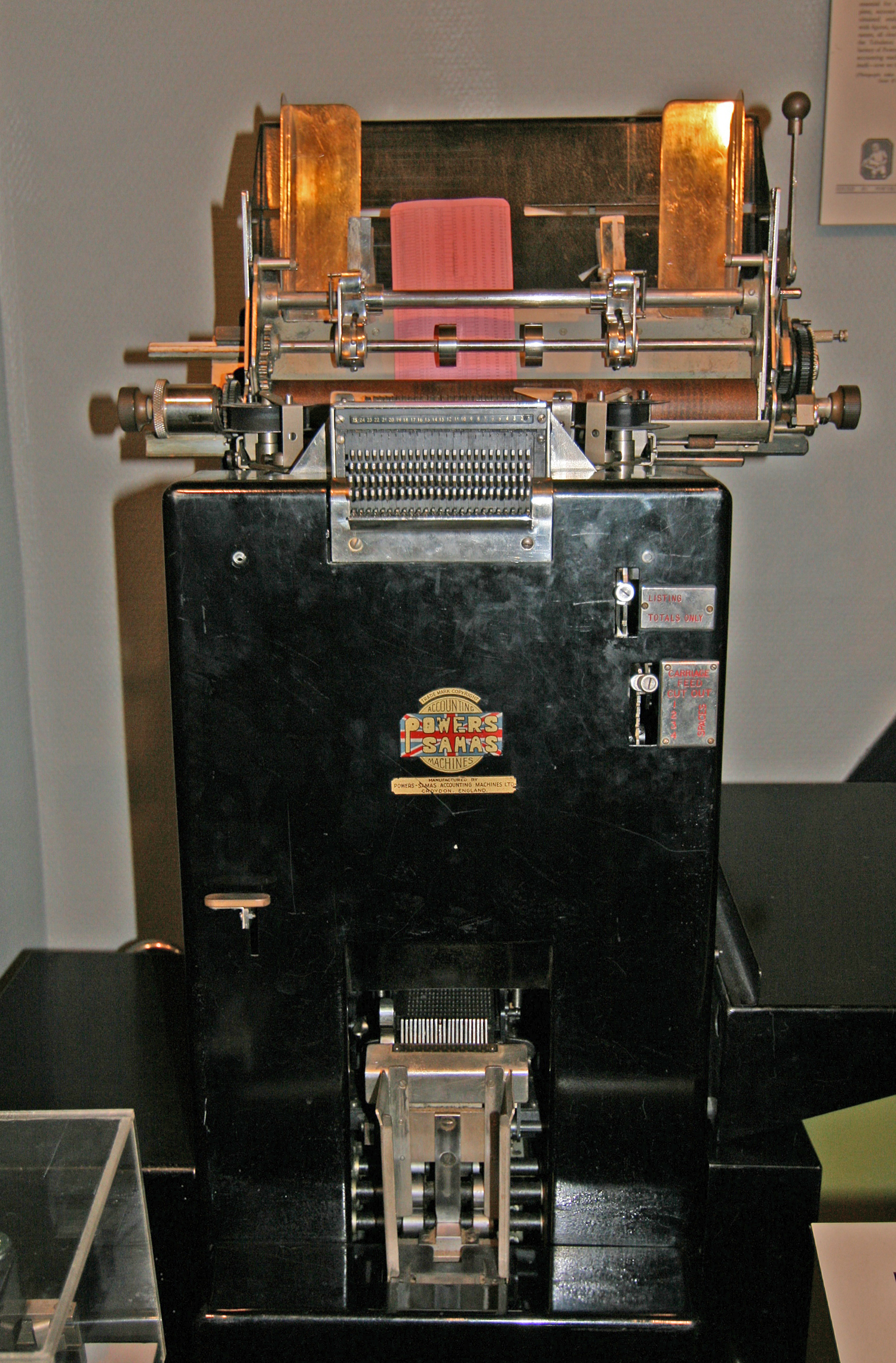
Powers-Samas accounting machine

Powers-Samas was a British company which sold unit record equipment.

In 1915, Powers Tabulating Machine Company established European operations through the Accounting and Tabulating Machine Company of Great Britain Limited. In 1929, it was renamed to Powers-Samas Accounting Machines Limited (Samas, full name Société Anonyme des Machines à Statistiques, had been the Powers' sales agency in France, formed in 1922). The informal reference "Acc and Tab" would persist.

During the Second World War it produced large numbers of Typex cipher machines, derived from the German Enigma, for use by the British Armed Forces and other government departments. In 1959, it merged with the competing British Tabulating Machine Company (BTM) to form International Computers and Tabulators (ICT).

== Description ==
Powers-Samas machines detected the holes in punched cards mechanically, unlike IBM equipment where holes in punched cards are detected by electrical circuits. Pins that could drop through round holes in punched cards were connected to linkages and their displacement when a hole was present actuated other parts of the machine to produce the desired results.

Setting up a machine involved building a suitable network of linkages. According to one user, this:

was achieved by locating above the reading block, in contact with the tops of the matrix pins, a removable Y-shaped 'connection box' (equivalent to the Hollerith plug board) which was hard-wired spcifically [sic] to the job. The box had at the base as many rods as were needed to read the positions within the used data fields, so that, when forced down, appropriate features of the machine - printheads, counters or control links were physically set as a reaction to the moving tops of the connecting box rods. Thus while many connection wires were straight-through, some sensed holes needed to allow multiple actuation, while some multiple code-punching needed to be combined to achieve a single purpose. Designing the system, including setting up the tabulator, was the sales engineers job, while soldering the 'conn-box' forest of cranked rods to meet the design requirement was down to the skill of the Powers Engineer who was thus the doyen of the machine room.

Powers-Samas used a variety of card sizes and formats, including 21, 36, 40, 45, 65 and 130 column cards. The 40-column card, measuring 4.35 by 2 inches, was the most common.
