= IBM CPC =

Card-Programmed Electronic Calculator

IBM Card-Programmed Electronic Calculator

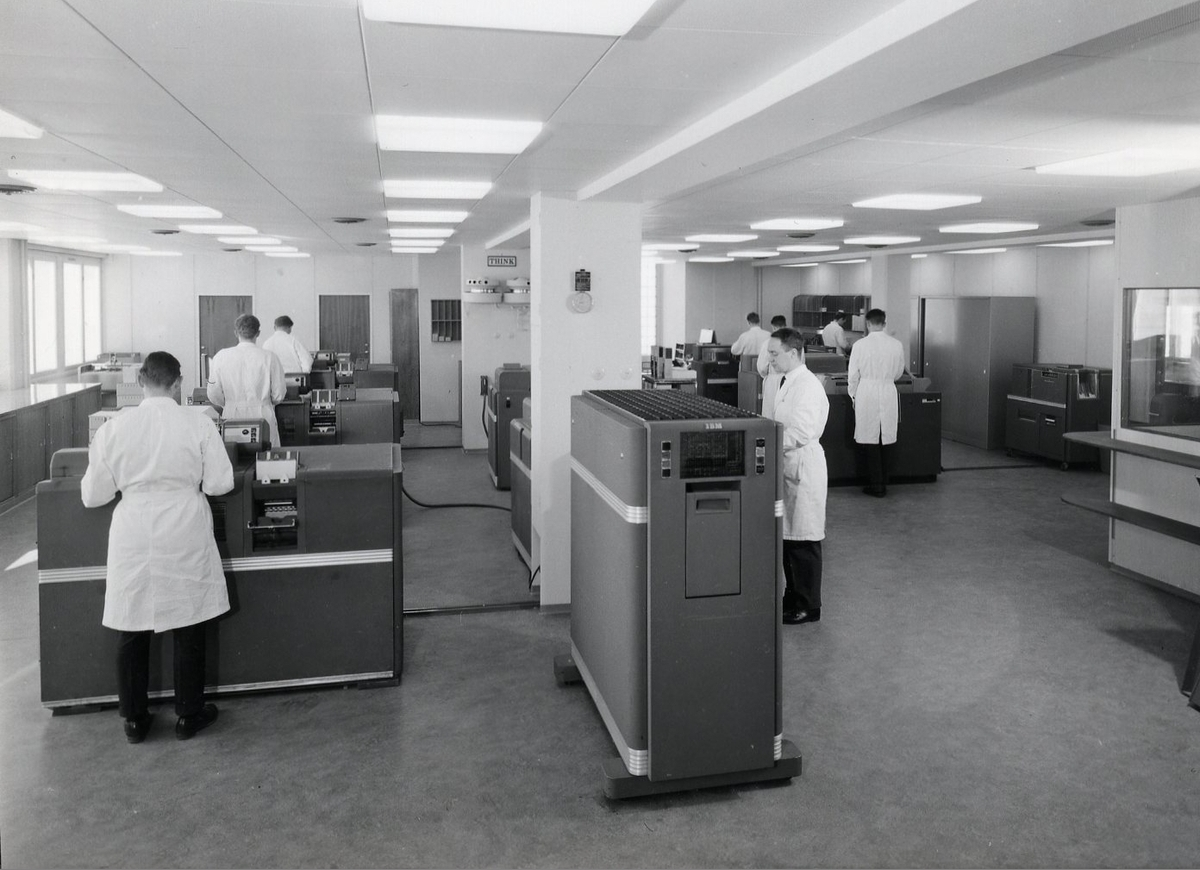
- IBM CPC assembly, with IBM 604 module on front
- Type: calculator
- Released: 1949; 77 years ago
- Predecessor: IBM 603
- Successor: IBM 608

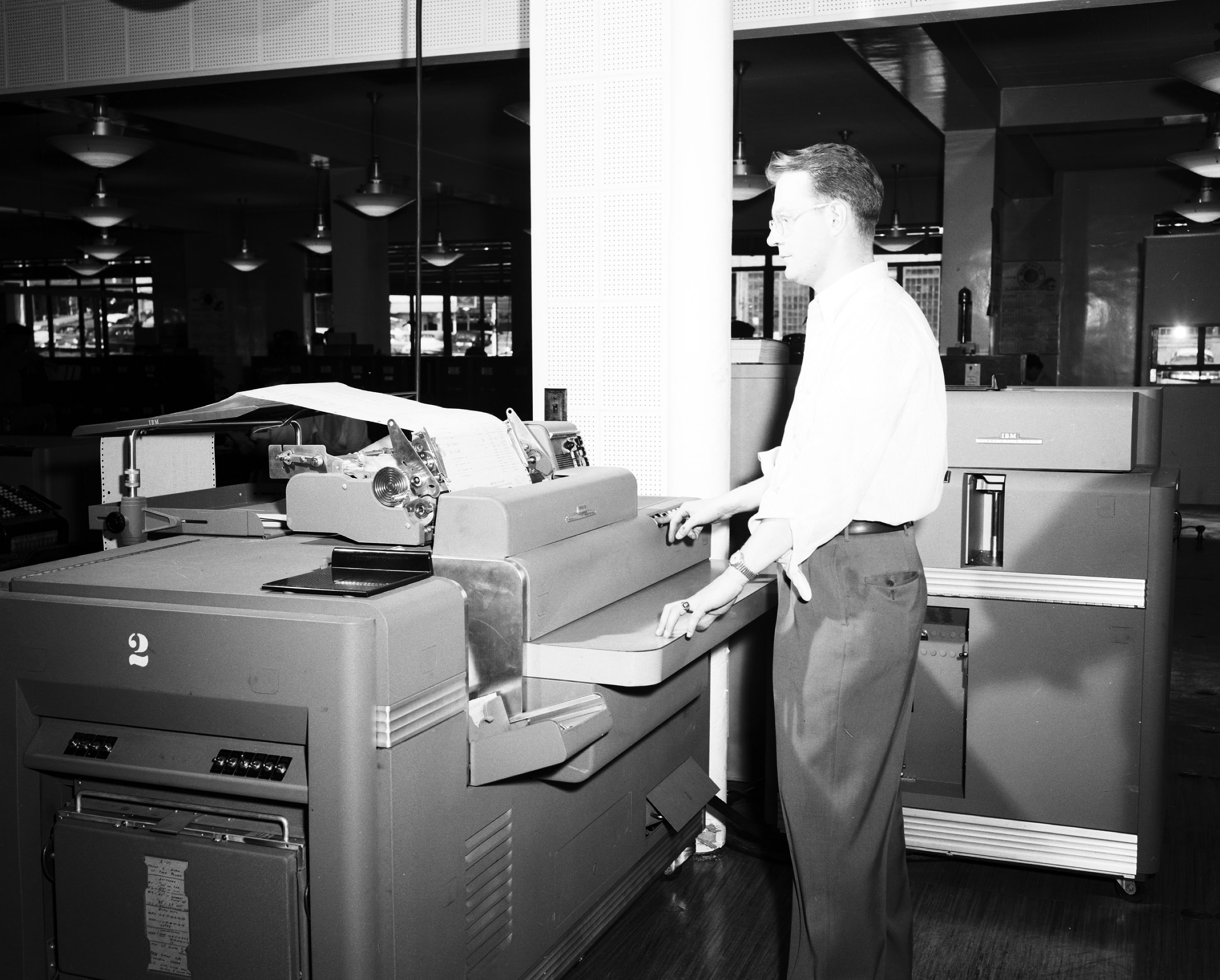
IBM CPC in 1954

The IBM Card-Programmed Electronic Calculator or CPC was announced by IBM in May 1949. Later that year an improved machine, the CPC-II, was also announced.

IBM's electronic (vacuum tube) calculators can perform multiple calculations, including division.

The card-programmed calculators uses fields on punched cards not to specify the actual operations to be performed on data, but which "microprogram" hard-coded onto the plugboard of the IBM 604 or 605 calculator machine to use. A set of cards produced different results when used with different plugboards. The units can be configured to retain up to 10 instructions in memory and perform them in a loop.

The original CPC Calculator has the following units interconnected by cables:

- Electronic Calculating Punch
  - IBM 604 with reader/punch unit IBM 521
- Accounting Machine
  - IBM 402 or
  - IBM 417

The CPC-II Calculator has the following units interconnected by cables:

- Electronic Calculating Punch
  - IBM 605 with punch unit IBM 527
- Accounting Machine
  - IBM 407 or
  - IBM 412 or
  - IBM 418
- Optional Auxiliary Storage Units (up to 3)
  - IBM 941, each could store 16 decimal numbers with ten digits plus sign.

From the IBM Archives:

The IBM Card-Programmed Electronic Calculator was announced in May 1949 as a versatile general purpose computer designed to perform any predetermined sequence of arithmetical operations coded on standard 80-column punched cards. It was also capable of selecting and following one of several sequences of instructions as a result of operations already performed, and it could store instructions for self-programmed operation. The Calculator consisted of a Type 605 Electronic Calculating Punch and a Type 412 or 418 Accounting Machine. A Type 941 Auxiliary Storage Unit was available as an optional feature. All units composing the Calculator were interconnected by flexible cables. If desired, the Type 412 or 418, with or without the Type 941, could be operated independently of the other machines. The Type 605 could be used as a Calculating Punch and the punch unit (Type 527) could be operated as an independent gang punch.

Customer deliveries of the CPC began in late 1949, at which time more than 20 had been ordered by government agencies and laboratories and aircraft manufacturers. Nearly 700 CPC systems were delivered during the first-half of the 1950s.

== See also ==
- Unit record equipment
- List of vacuum tube computers
