= IBM 608 =

World's first marketed all-transistorized calculator

The IBM 608 Transistor Calculator, a plugboard-programmable unit, was the first IBM product to use transistor circuits without any vacuum tubes and is believed to be the world's first all-transistorized calculator to be manufactured for the commercial market. Announced in April 1955, it was released in December 1957. The 608 was withdrawn from marketing in April 1959.

== History ==
The chief designer of the circuits used in the IBM 608 was Robert A. Henle, who later oversaw the development of emitter-coupled logic (ECL) class of circuits. The development of the 608 was preceded by the prototyping of an experimental all-transistor version of the 604. Although this was built and demonstrated in October 1954, it was not commercialized.

To spur the adoption of transistor technology, shortly before the first IBM 608 shipped, Tom Watson directed that a date be set after which no new vacuum-tube-based products would be released. This decision constrained IBM product managers, who otherwise had the latitude to select components for their products, to make the move to transistors. As a result, the successor to the IBM 650 used transistors, and it became the IBM 7070—the company's first transistorized stored-program computer.

It was similar in nature of operation to the vacuum-tube IBM 604, which had been introduced a decade earlier. Although the 608 outpaced its immediate predecessor, the IBM 607 by a factor of 2.5, it was soon rendered obsolete by newer IBM products and only a few dozen were ever delivered.

== Overview ==
The 608 contains more than 3,000 germanium transistors. The use of transistors was a significant departure from the previous IBM calculators of this line. The 608's transistors made possible a 50 percent reduction in physical size and a 90 percent reduction in power requirements over comparable vacuum tube models. The 608 uses magnetic core memory, but is programmed using a control panel. The main memory of the 608 can store 40 nine-digit numbers, and it has an 18-digit accumulator. In raw speed terms, it can perform 4,500 additions per second, it can multiply two nine-digit numbers, yielding an 18-digit result in 11 milliseconds, and it can divide an 18-digit number by a nine-digit number to produce the nine-digit quotient in 13 milliseconds. The 608 can handle 80 program steps.

The 608 was supplied with a type 535 card reader/punch which had its own control plugboard.

== See also ==
- Unit record equipment
- History of IBM
