= IBM 603 =

Control panel programmable electronic calculating card punch

- Developer: IBM
- Manufacturer: IBM
- Type: Vacuum-tube calculator
- Released: 1946; 80 years ago
- Predecessor: IBM 601
- Successor: IBM CPC with IBM 604 computing unit
- Related: IBM 602

The IBM 603 Electronic Multiplier was the first mass-produced commercial electronic calculating device. It uses full-size vacuum tubes to perform multiplication and addition. (The earlier IBM 601 and released in the same year IBM 602 used relay logic.) The IBM 603 was adapted as the arithmetic unit in the IBM Selective Sequence Electronic Calculator. It was designed by James W. Bryce, and included circuits patented by A. Halsey Dickenson in 1937. The IBM 603 was developed in Endicott, New York, and announced on September 27, 1946.

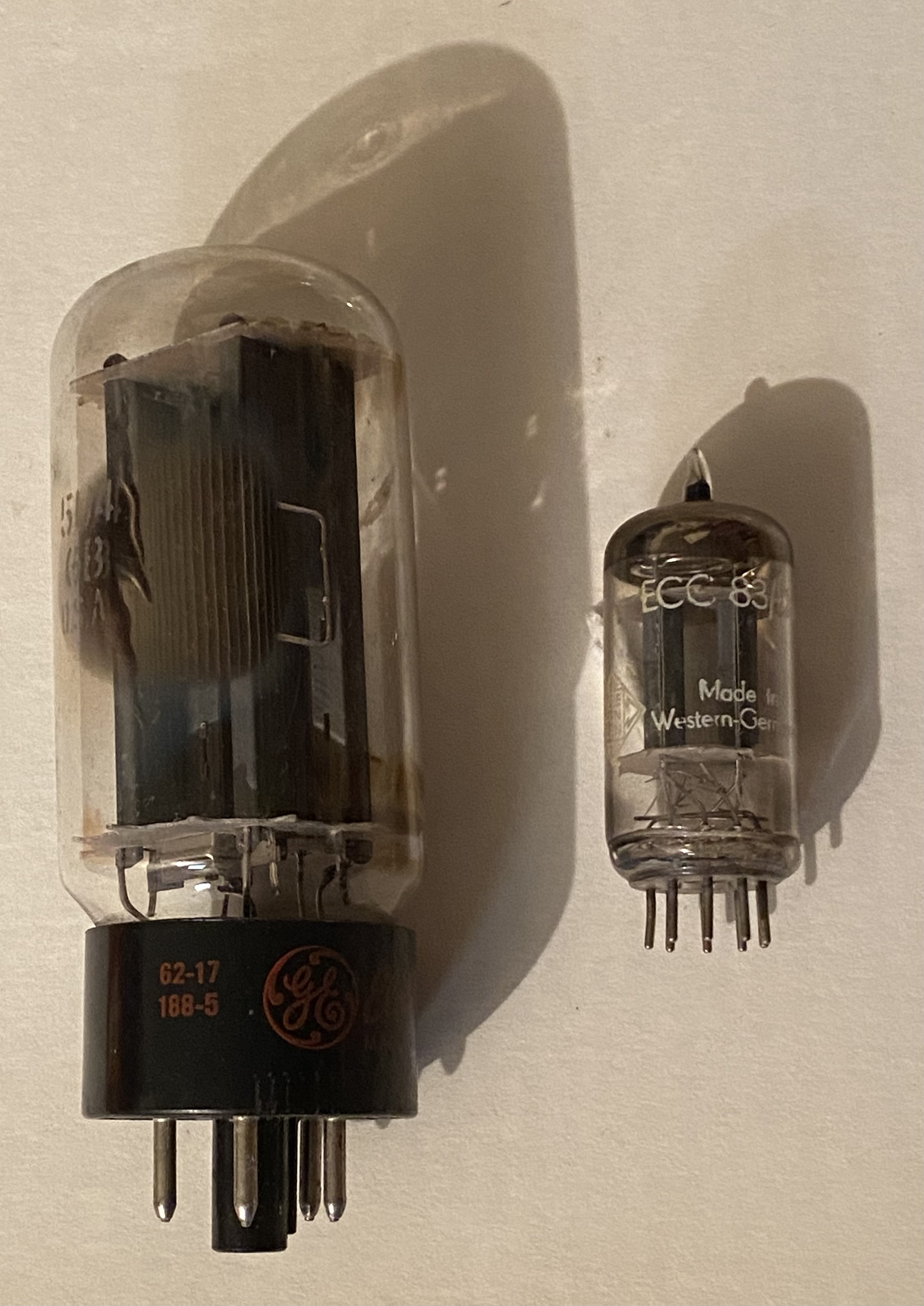
Full size and miniature vacuum tubes

IBM's CEO Thomas J. Watson was doubtful of the product, but commercialization was pushed for by his son Thomas J. Watson Jr. Only about 20 were built since the bulky tubes made it hard to manufacture, but the demand showed that the product was filling a need. Ralph Palmer and Jerrier Haddad were hired to develop a more refined and versatile version of the 603, which became the IBM 604 Electronic Calculating Punch. The 604 uses miniature tubes and a patented design for pluggable modules, which made the product easier to manufacture and service. Throughout the following 10 years IBM would build and lease 5600 units of the IBM 604.
