= IBM 604 =

Control panel programmable electronic calculating card punch

IBM 604 Electronic Calculating Punch

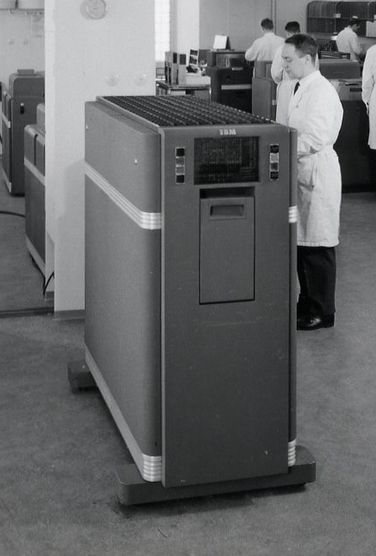
- IBM 604 as part of IBM CPC assembly
- Manufacturer: IBM
- Product family: 600 series
- Type: Vacuum tube calculator
- Released: 1948; 78 years ago
- Lifespan: ~35 years
- Units shipped: 5400
- Input: punched cards
- Weight: 540 kg
- Predecessor: IBM 603
- Successor: IBM 608
- Related: IBM CPC

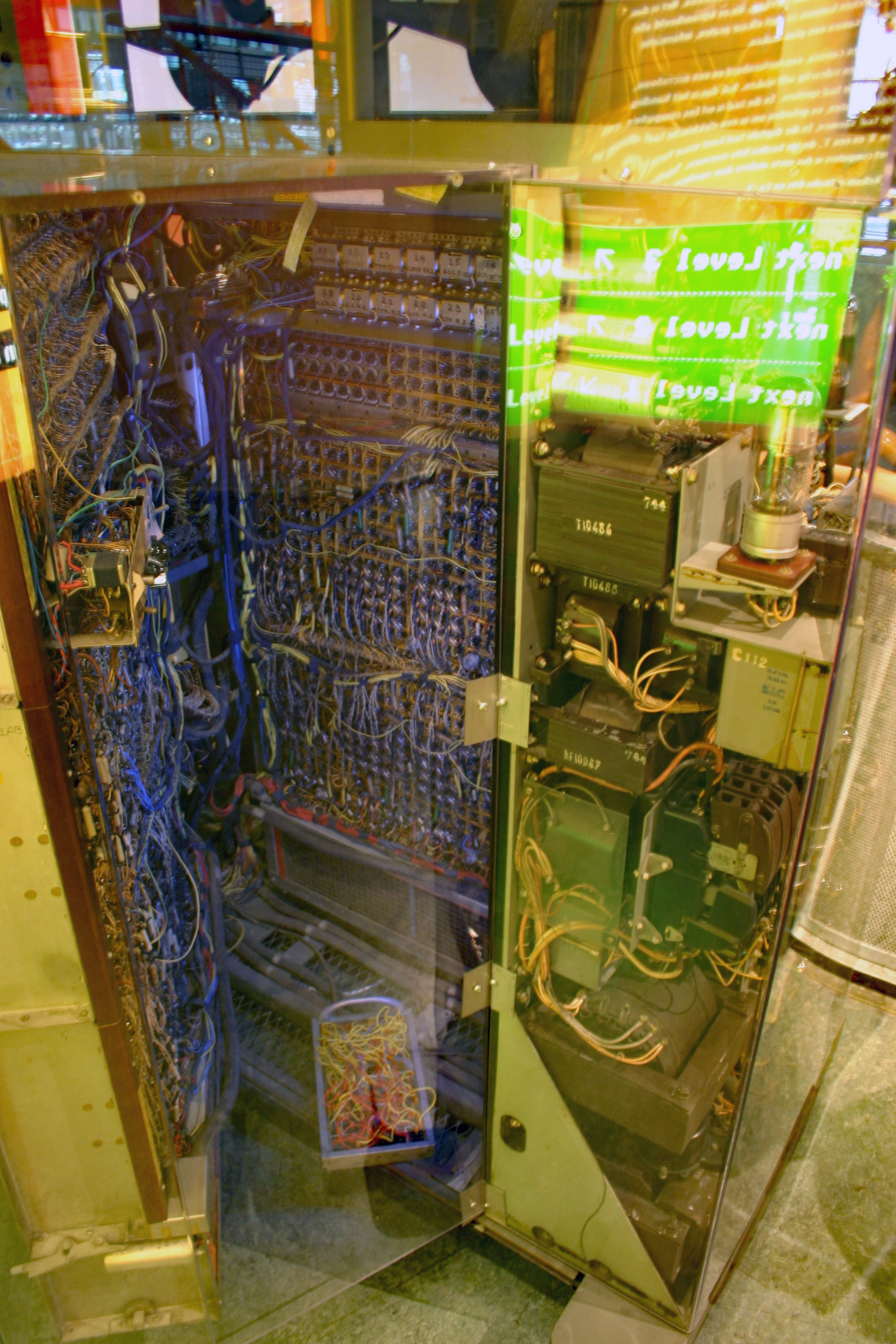
IBM 604 Electronic Calculator at NEMO national science museum in Amsterdam. Note plugboard control panel used to program the 604, at bottom.

The IBM 604 Electronic Calculating Punch was one of the world's first mass-produced electronic calculator along with its predecessor the IBM 603. It is an electronic unit record machine that can perform multiple calculations, including division. It was invented and developed by Ralph Palmer, Jerrier Haddad and Byron Phelps. It was introduced by IBM in 1948.

It can read a punched card from a deck, do some calculations based on the wiring of its plugboard, and punch results onto the same card. A separate IBM 521 Card Read/Punch processed the cards and had its own plugboard which selected the columns to be read and those to be punched.

The 604 and a modified version, the 605, were used as components of the Card Programmed Electronic Calculators (CPC and CPC II). The 604 was also a component of the Test Assembly, a precursor to IBM's early computers. The circuit module design and packaging was also used for the IBM 650, the world's first mass-produced computer and a very popular computer during the 1960s.

An all-transistor version of the 604 was built and demonstrated in October 1954. Although it used over 2200 transistors as opposed to 1250 tubes in the original, it occupied only about half the volume, and used only 5% as much power. This was only an experimental machine, but its technology was used to build the IBM 608, which shipped in December 1957, and was the world's first all-transistorized electronic calculator to be mass produced.

Most of the circuitry was based on modifications of circuit designs used in the earlier 603 Electronic Multiplier and was packaged in small replaceable pluggable units, each typically containing one miniature vacuum tube. A limited number of standardized circuit designs were used, which made the product more easily manufactured and serviced. The calculation unit contained 1,250 tubes. Clock speed was increased from the 603's rate of 35kHz to 50 kHz. The 604 performed fixed-point addition, subtraction, multiplication and division using BCD arithmetic.

Initial versions supported 40 program steps, and this was soon expanded to 60. Processing was still locked to the reader/punch cycle time, thus program execution had to complete within the time between a punched card leaving the read station and entering the punch station.

Considerable expectations for the future of the business rested on the 604, upon which a corresponding amount of planning talent had been invested. While planners at IBM estimated they would sell 75 units, they eventually sold over 5600. They were manufactured by IBM in Kenyon House at their Poughkeepsie NY facility. IBM staff joked that the product was "engineered in the attic and assembled in the basement". An article in IBM Think magazine published in July 1975 claimed there were still 434 still in operation.

An IBM 604 is preserved at the American Computer Museum and another at the University of Amsterdam Computer Museum.

In the comic series The Adventures of Tintin, two scientists work with a 604 to send Tintin, the main character of the comic series, to the Moon.

== Photos ==
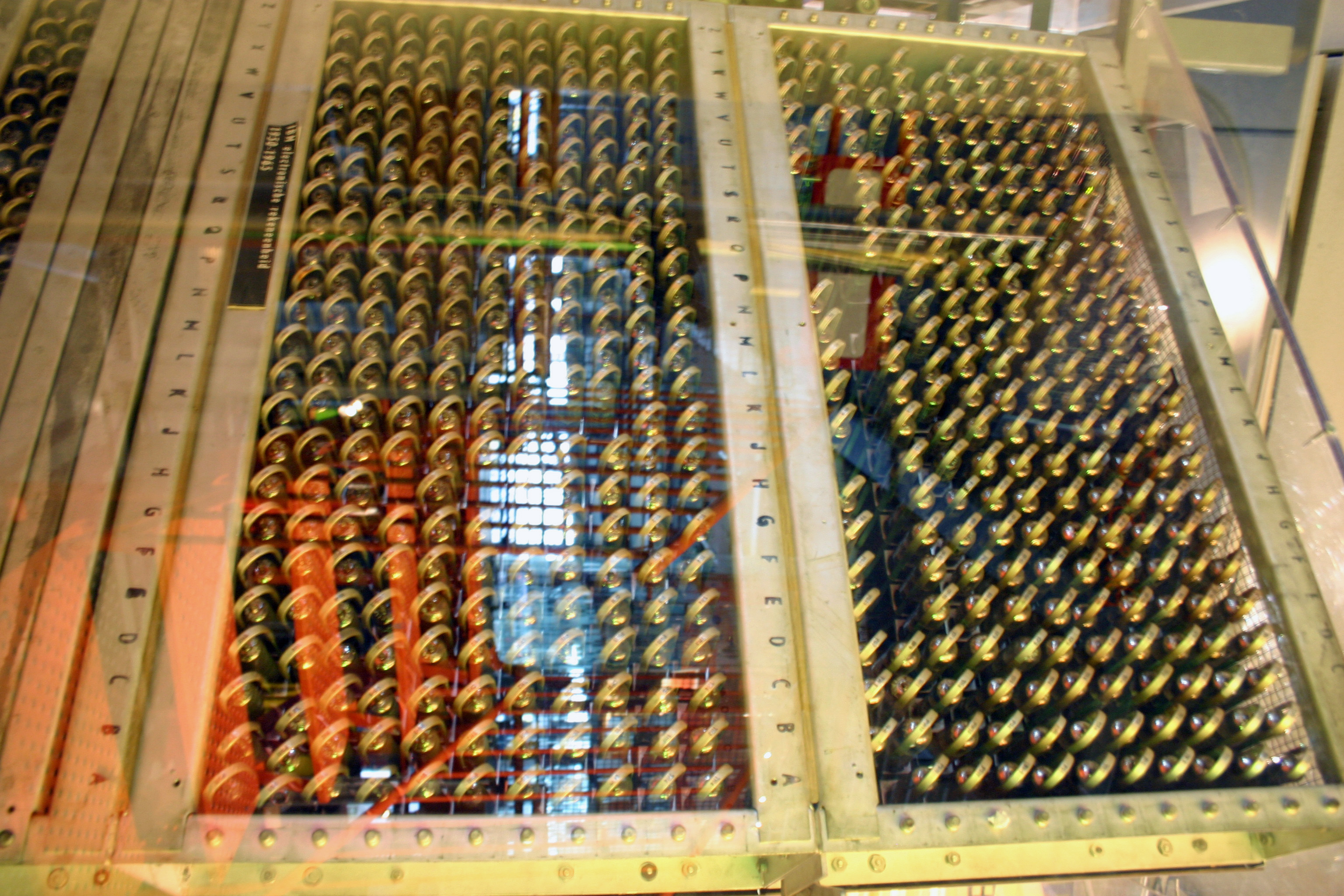
IBM 604 vacuum tube modules

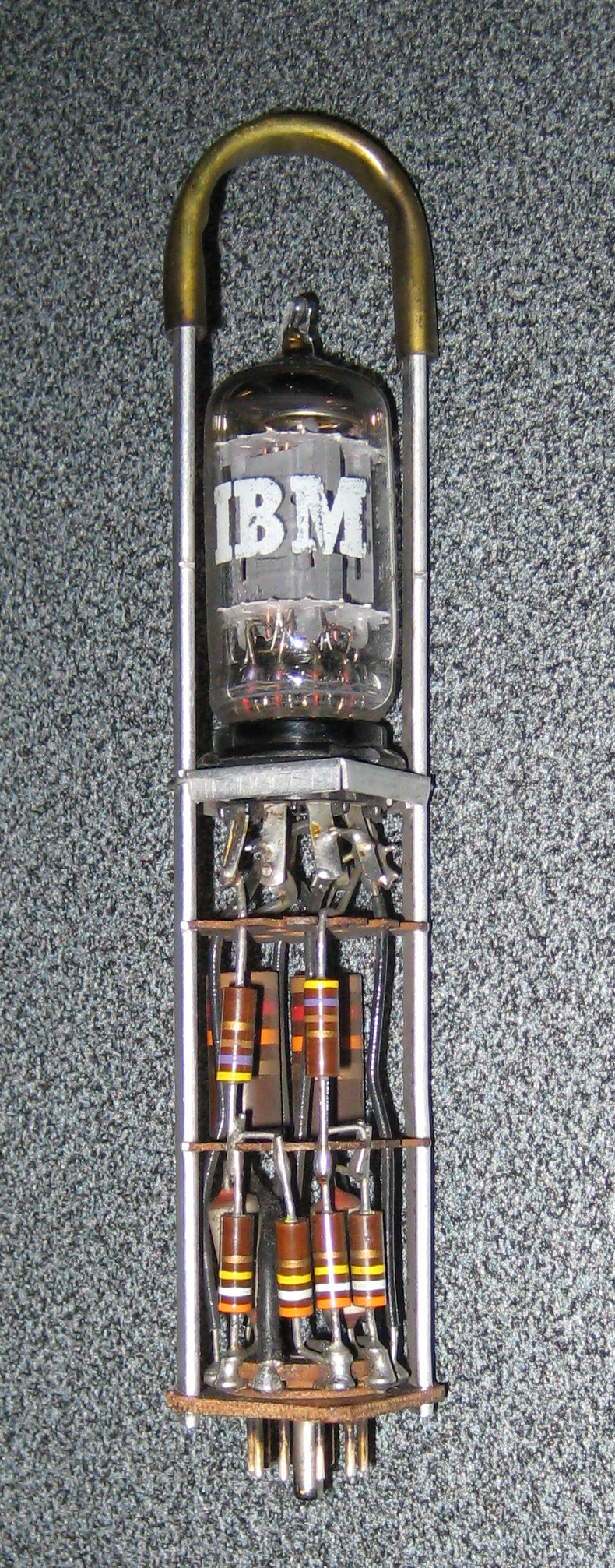
Single vacuum tube module

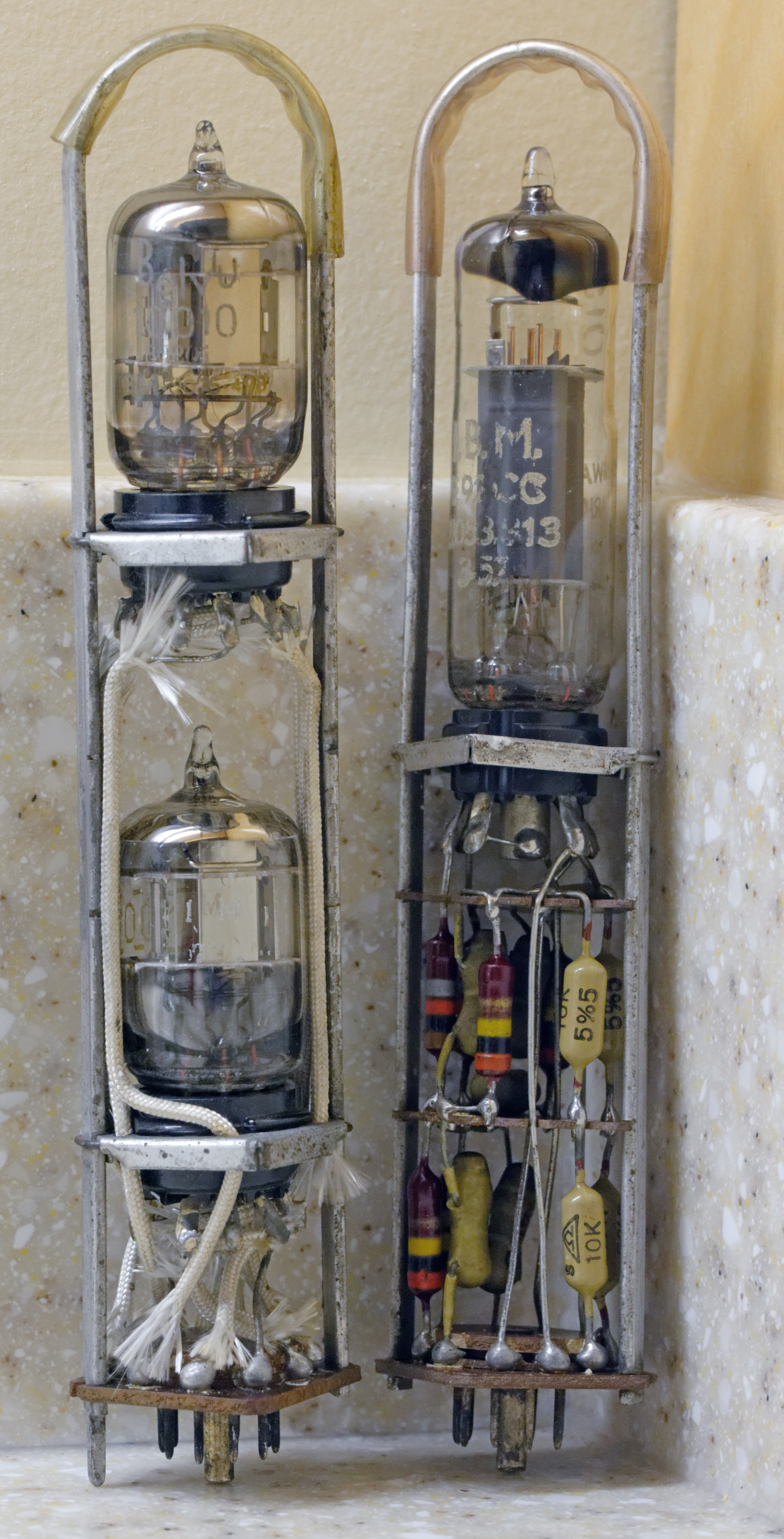
Two-tube modules

== See also ==
- IBM 603
- IBM 608
- IBM 701
- List of IBM products
- List of vacuum-tube computers
