= IBM hammer printers =

IBM system printers that used hammer technology

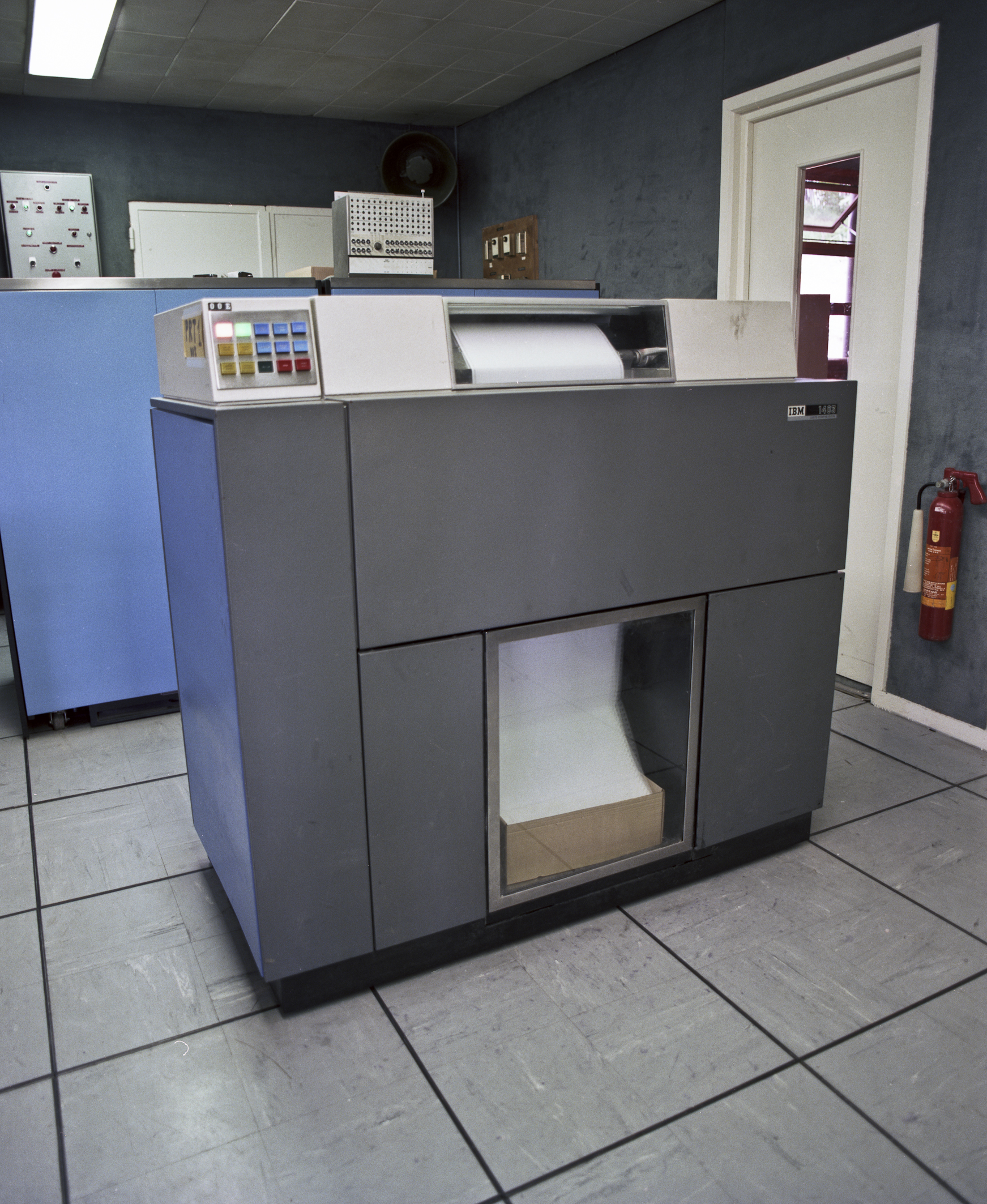
- IBM 1403-N1
- Date invented: 1959
- Discontinued: 1999

IBM developed, manufactured and sold hammer-based impact printers that used either type bars, a chain, a train, or a band to create printed output from 1959 till 1999, replacing the older print drum technology,. Over the course of this time they produced a wide variety of these line printers. This article will detail the most significant ones. Note that while IBM initially described band printers as belt printers, they are effectively the same thing.

Note the acronym lpm used throughout this article stands for lines per minute, being a measure of print speed. In general the maximum lpm for a printer is based on the use of a repeating set of 48 characters, referred to as a character set.

== Chain and train printers ==
The printers are listed here in the order they were announced.

=== IBM 1403 ===
Released in 1959, the IBM 1403 Model 1 is the first hammer based printer produced by IBM. It uses type slugs on a chain and is the first IBM printer to do so.

In 1967 the IBM 1403 Model N1 is the first IBM printer to use a train rather than a chain. This change is made because it is not possible to achieve higher speeds using a chain. It is called a train as the print slugs move inside a machined track, resembling rail-road cars.

=== IBM 5203 ===
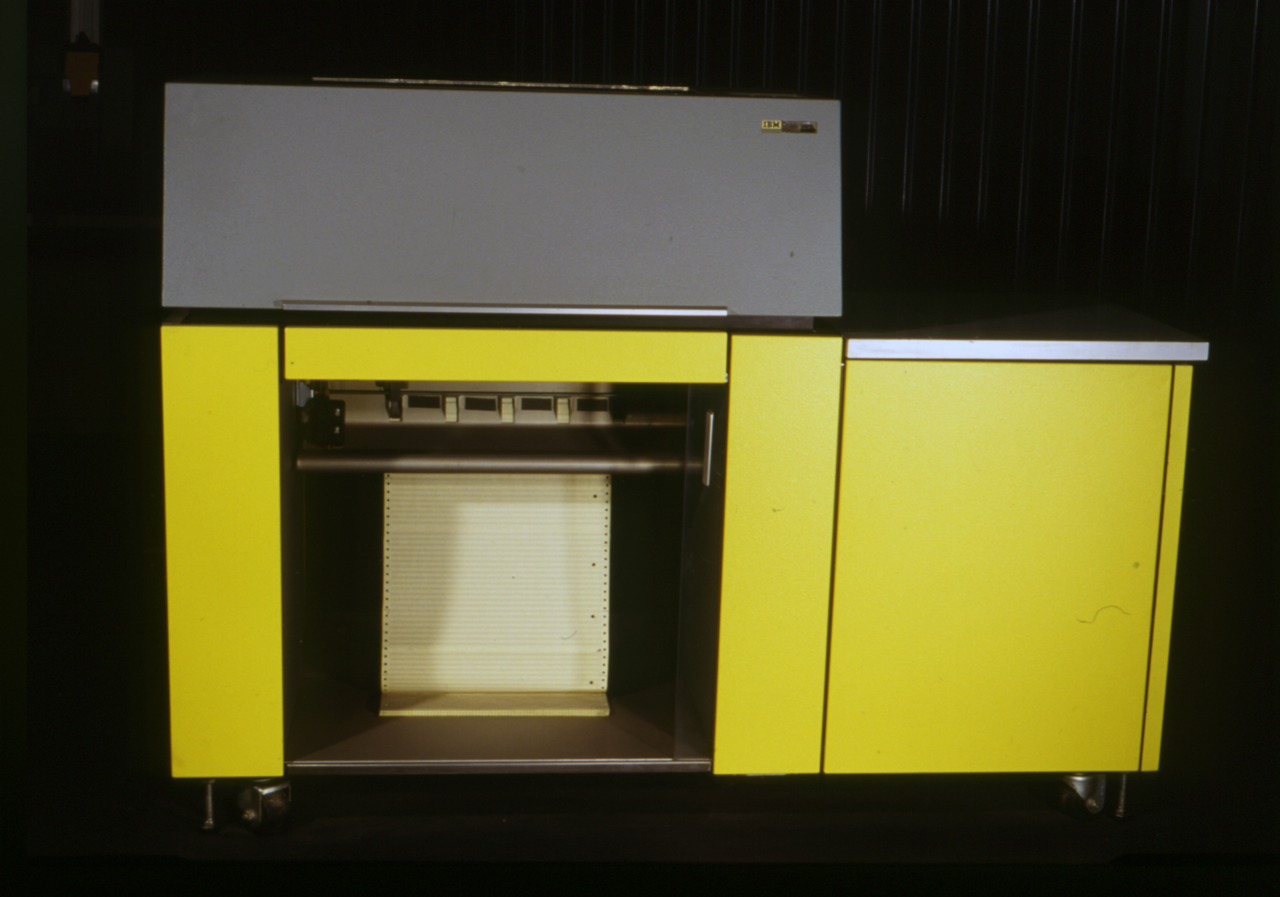
IBM 5203 with yellow covers

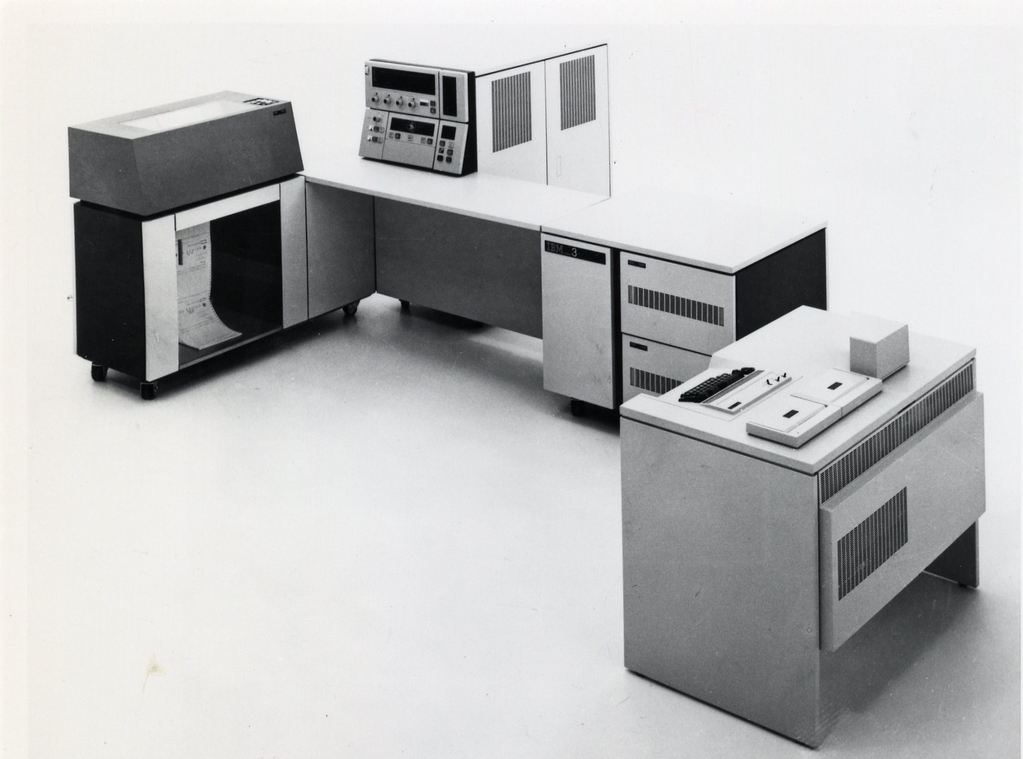
IBM System/3 with IBM 5203

The IBM 5203 is a line printer that uses interchangeable train cartridges. By default it has 96 print positions, which can be optionally expanded to 120 or 132 positions. The train itself has 240 characters, with the standard character set having 48 characters repeated 5 times. A single IBM 5203 (of any model) can be used with the IBM System/3 as an alternative to the IBM 1403. A Model 3 can be attached to an IBM S/370 using an integrated printer attachment (the same one later used by the IBM 3203), meaning it did not use a channel or require a control unit. The covers could be ordered in red, yellow, blue, gray or white.

5203 Models
| Model | Speed (lpm) | Announced | Withdrawn | Weight | Length | Width | Height | BTU |
|---|---|---|---|---|---|---|---|---|
| 1 | 100 | July 30, 1969 | December 10, 1982 | 550 lb (250 kg) | 56 1/4 in (143 cm) | 20 in (51 cm) | 41 1/2 in (105 cm) | 2,000 BTU (500 kcal) |
| 2 | 200 | July 30, 1969 | December 10, 1982 | 550 lb (250 kg) | 56 1/4 in (143 cm) | 20 in (51 cm) | 41 1/2 in (105 cm) | 2,000 BTU (500 kcal) |
| 3 | 300 | October 16, 1970 | December 10, 1982 | 550 lb (250 kg) | 56 1/4 in (143 cm) | 20 in (51 cm) | 41 1/2 in (105 cm) | 3,300 BTU (830 kcal) |

=== IBM 3211 ===
The 3211 was announced on June 30, 1970. Operating at up to 2000 lpm, it compared well to the 1403-002 which ran at 600 lpm and the 1403-N1 which ran at 1100 lpm.

It is actually a combination of three separate machine types:

==== IBM 3211 ====
This is the printer component. It was described as a front printer in that the hammer and the type elements are placed in front of the ribbon with the paper in the rear, against the platen. The combination of front printing, improved type design, oscillating platen and improved hammer dynamics meant that even though the train and the printer both ran much faster, print quality was actually improved over previous printers.

It has the following significant features:

- An interchangeable train type print cartridge (the 3216) that contains all the type elements (see below).
- An oscillating platen that can automatically sense the form thickness (meaning the operator does not need to set this). The platen moves forward as each line is printed and then retracts as the form is advanced to the next line.
- It uses a programmable forms control buffer rather than paper carriage tapes.
- The paper can advance at up to 90 inches per second
- An enhanced power stacker. This was needed as the printer could empty a standard box of paper in 10 minutes.
- 132 print positions, that can optionally be expanded to 150 positions.
- The printer cover automatically opens when the printer has an issue, such as being out of paper, having a full stacker or having a forms jam. It can also open by program control. Operators need to take care not to leave objects on top of the printer for this reason.
- It had a special control panel for a service representative to use to run diagnostics, meaning tests could be run without relying on the host system.

OCR printing capability was added on March 13, 1972,

The 3211 is 145 cm (57 in) long, 74 cm (29 in) wide and 136 cm (54 in) high. It weighs 640 kg (1,410 lb).

==== IBM 3216 ====
Described as a train type cartridge, it can be installed and replaced by an operator.

- It has 432 print elements mounted on 108 carriers (4 characters per carrier). This is larger than the IBM 1416 used by the 1403 and 3203 which has 240 characters (80 slugs with 3 characters per slug)
- A new style type slug that is not engraved on the carrier, but suspended on the train elements
- It includes an oiler mechanism.
- It has two large T handles to lift it in and out of the 3211.
- Each 3216 is transported and stored in a specially designed, one-piece, solid-plastic, molded case designed by C Sheikofsky and F. Strauss.

The maximum speed of the 3211 was determined by the train configuration, based on how large a character set was and how many times that set was repeated. The printer was interlocked to not exceed 2500 lpm.

3211 Minimum line rates based on train configuration
| Array Length | Number of array repeats | Minimum print rate (lpm) |
|---|---|---|
| 27 | 16 | 2500 |
| 36 | 12 | 2430 |
| 48 | 9 | 2000 |
| 54 | 8 | 1837 |
| 72 | 6 | 1477 |
| 108 | 4 | 1060 |
| 144 | 3 | 827 |
| 216 | 2 | 574 |
| 432 | 1 | 300 |

Print trains could be ordered in different arrangements, such as A11 (Standard Commercial), 48 graphics in 9 identical arrays or H11 (Standard Scientific), 48 graphics in 9 identical arrays. While the 48 character sets typically achieved 2000 lpm, other arrangements varied according to the table below:

Special cartridge throughput rates
| Arrangement | Characters | ArraySize | Number of Arrays | Minimum lpm | Expected lpm |
|---|---|---|---|---|---|
| G11 (ASCII) | 64 | 108 | 4 | 1060 | 1765 |
| P11 (PL 1) | 60 | 108 | 4 | 1060 | 1815 |
| T11 (Text) | 120 | 144 | 3 | 827 | 906 |

==== IBM 3811 ====
This is the printer control unit, that controls and buffers the printer. It contains the circuitry needed to attach the printer to the channel.

It is 74 cm (29 in) long, 74 cm (29 in) wide and 117 cm (46 in) high and weighs 380 to 350 kg (840 to 770 lb) based on power 50/60 Hz.

==== Withdrawal ====
The 3211-1 and 3811-1 were withdrawn by IBM on May 1, 1985. The replacement product is the IBM 4245

=== IBM 3203 ===
The 3203 is mechanically similar to the IBM 1403-N1. The 3203 is a line printer that used an interchangeable train cartridge known as the IBM 1416. It does not require a carriage control tape. It has an inbuilt vacuum cleaner.

Models 1 to 4, do not require a separate channel or control unit, but require the S/370 (or S/3 or S/38 or 3770 in the case of the Model 3) to have an integrated 3203 printer attachment feature. The Model 1 attaches to S/370 Models 115 and 125 and the Model 4 attaches to the S/370 Models 138 and 148.

The Model 005 is a standalone printer that can be directly attached to a parallel channel without a separate control unit or integrated adapter.

Maximum print speed is 1580 lpm with a 32 character set.

One unique capacity of the 3203 was the ability to print Braille. This was done by using an operator installed rubber strip across the face of the hammers and a special train cartridge that could, with the correct programming, print the matrix of dots needed for Braille cells.

3203 Models
| Model | Speed (lpm) | Connection | Announced | Withdrawn | Weight (kg) | Length (cm) | Width (cm) | Height (cm) |
|---|---|---|---|---|---|---|---|---|
| 1 | 600 | Integrated 3203 printer attachment | March 3, 1973 | Jan 30, 1979 | 370 | 143 | 51 | 117 |
| 2 | 1200 | Integrated 3203 printer attachment | March 3, 1973 | Jan 30, 1979 | 370 | 143 | 51 | 117 |
| 3 | 1000/1200* | Integrated 3203 printer attachment | Oct 20, 1975 | August 2, 1986 | | | | |
| 4 | 1200 | Integrated 3203 printer attachment | June 30, 1976 | Jan 30, 1979 | 370 | 143 | 51 | 117 |
| 5 | 1200 | Parallel Channel | Jan 30, 1979 | August 2, 1986 | 485 | 223 | 51 | 117 |

By default the 3203-3 can print 1000 lpm with a 48 character-set train. There is a speed enhancement feature that increases the speed to 1200 lpm. It can be cable connected to an IBM 3777 controller as well as an IBM System/3 or IBM System/38.

==== IBM 1416 ====
The IBM 1416 is an interchangeable train cartridge introduced with the 1403-N1 and also used with the IBM 3203. This meant that instead of using a chain of linked characters, the printer used a train of unlinked characters. It has 240 characters (80 slugs with 3 characters per slug), a typical configuration being the Universal Character Set which is five sets of the same 48 characters.

== Band printers ==
In the late 1960s IBM began development work on flexible band technology. The goal was to create lower cost printers that still had good print quality. Initial printers used one hammer for two print positions and were relatively slow. However over time IBM switched back to one hammer per print position so they could attain higher speeds.

=== IBM 3618 Administrative Line Printer ===
The first IBM band printer, it was released in 1974. It is a 155 lpm printer with a 48 character set and uses one hammer for two print positions. It has 80 printer positions, but could be ordered with 132 print positions as a feature. It is part of the IBM 3600 banking system and is loop attached to an IBM 3601 controller. The 64 character set band reduces nominal print speed to 120 lpm, while the 96 character set band reduces it to 80 lpm.

It was announced on August 10, 1973.

=== IBM 3288 ===
The IBM 3288 is a line printer that also uses one hammer for two print positions. It was released in 1974. With a 64 character set band, the maximum print speed is 120 lpm. With a 120 character set band, the maximum print speed is 80 lpm.

=== IBM 3776 Communication Terminal ===
Introduced in late 1974, it includes a print band printer that IBM describe as using an engraved character font belt. The Model 1 and 3 can print at 300 lpm, while Model 2 and 4 can print at 400 lpm while using a 48 character set band. It uses one hammer for each print position.

3776 maximum print speed
| Model | Maximum lpm | Character Set |
|---|---|---|
| 1 or 3 | 300 | 48 |
| 1 or 3 | 230 | 64 |
| 1 or 3 | 160 | 94 |
| 2 or 4 | 400 | 48 |
| 2 or 4 | 300 | 64 |
| 2 or 4 | 230 | 94 |

It was announced on December 9, 1974.

=== IBM 5211 ===
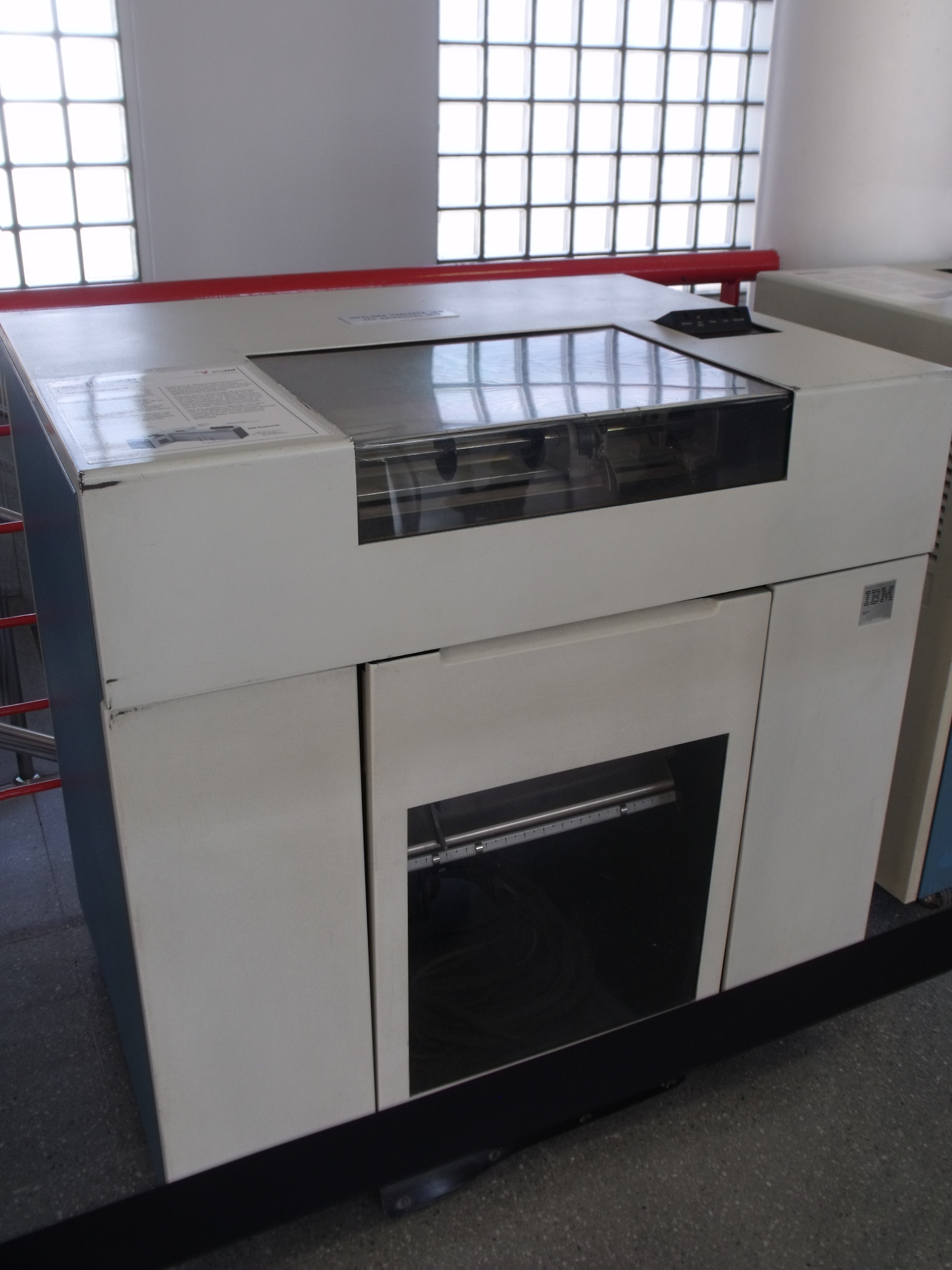
IBM 5211

This printer can run at 160 or 300 lpm and uses a special magnetically operated clamp to hold the forms tightly during printing. It has 132 print positions.

Models 1 and 2 were withdrawn on May 1, 1984.

=== IBM 3262 ===
This printer has considerably more microprocessing power, meaning it can perform user driven diagnostics without relying on an IBM Service Representative.

There are several models: The 3262 was manufactured in Jarfalla, Sweden. The C1 model is intended to be Customer Set-up (CSU). It uses a steel band with 288 characters.

IBM 3262 Models
| Model | Attachment | Maximum speed (lpm) | Announced | First Shipment | Withdrawn | Replacement Product |
|---|---|---|---|---|---|---|
| 1 | Parallel Channel | 650 | January 30, 1979 | | | |
| 11 | Parallel Channel | 325 | October 2, 1979 | | | |
| 2 | Loop to 8130/8140 | 650 | October 2, 1979 | | | |
| 12 | Loop to 8130/8140 | 325 | October 2, 1979 | | | |
| 3 | Coax | 650 | October 31, 1979 | | | |
| 13 | Coax | 325 | October 31, 1979 | | | |
| 5 | Parallel Channel | 650 | November 12, 1982 | September, 1983 | April 20, 1984 | IBM 5262 |
| B1 | System/36 | 650 | May 17, 1983 | | | |
| C1 | System/36 | 650 | May 17, 1983 | September, 1983 | April 20, 1984 | IBM 5262 |

=== IBM 5262 ===
Announced October 2, 1984 as a replacement for the IBM 3262, although the print bands are not compatible. It is also a 650 lpm printer. First shipments were October 1984.

The model 001 was twinax attached. It emulated an IBM 5256.

=== IBM 4245 ===
The IBM 4245 is a high-speed impact printer that uses an engraved band. IBM proposed it as a replacement for the 1403, 3203 and the 3211/3811. As an example the Montana Department of Administration bought three 4245s (a model 12 and two model 20s) in October 1985 to replace two IBM 1403s and a 3211/3811.

There are four consumable items:

- Print band.
- Printer ribbon.
- Plastic ribbon shield.
- Vacuum cleaner bag. This was used with the inbuilt vacuum cleaning system and was supplied free-of-charge by IBM provided the printer was under maintenance.

For the European market, they were manufactured in Jarfalla, Sweden.

There are seven models:

==== Model 001 ====
This was announced on May 3, 1983. It is a 2000 line per minute printer. It is physically the same size as the 3203–005.

There is no scheduled maintenance for the IBM 4245. It has a 3-month warranty.

The Model 1 is 223 cm (88 in) long, 94 cm (37 in) wide (with side stacker) and 117 cm (46 in) high and weighs 500 kg (1,100 lb).

It was withdrawn by IBM on July 16, 1985, directly replaced by the 4245–020.

==== Models 12 and 20 ====
These were announced on April 16, 1985, with first shipments planned for planned for June 28, 1985. The model 12 is rated at 1200 lpm while the model 20 is rated at 2000 lpm.

The model 020 was announced as being a significant Improvement over the model 001 with the following enhancements:

- Could print OCR
- Improved print quality
- Higher reliability
- Easier access to the paper loading area via removal of a bar on the front of the machine
- Improved top cover
- Improved power stacker
- 25% smaller than the 4245-001
- Operated at 64 dB

The model 12/20 and other models are 152.5 cm (60.0 in) long, 95 cm (37 in) wide (with side stacker) and 117 cm (46 in) high and weighs 410 kg (900 lb).

There are a total of 6 models based around the Model 12/20 design.

4245 Models
| Model | Speed (lpm) | Connection | Announced | First Shipment | Withdrawn | Replacement Product |
|---|---|---|---|---|---|---|
| 1 | 2000 | Parallel Channel | May 3, 1983 | | July 16, 1985 | 4245-020 |
| 12 | 1200 | Parallel Channel | April 16, 1985 | June 28, 1985 | May 1, 1992 | 6262-014 |
| 20 | 2000 | Parallel Channel | April 16, 1985 | June 28, 1985 | May 1, 1992 | 6262-022 |
| D12 | 1200 | Coax | May 1, 1985 | | May 1, 1992 | 6262-D12 |
| D20 | 2000 | Coax | May 1, 1985 | | May 1, 1992 | 6262-D22 |
| T12 | 1200 | Twinax | June 16, 1986 | September 1986 | May 1, 1992 | 6262-T12 |
| T20 | 2000 | Twinax | June 16, 1986 | September 1986 | May 1, 1992 | 6262-T22 |

==== Models D12 and D20 ====
They can be coaxially attached to an IBM 3274 or IBM 4701 controllers. meaning it can be mainframe attached without use of a parallel bus/tag channel. This makes it IBM's fastest coaxially attached printer at that time compared to the 3262-003 which ran at 650 lpm.

==== Models T12 and T20 ====
They can be attached via twinax to the IBM System/36 and System/38

=== IBM 4248 ===
The IBM 4248 is a high-speed impact printer that uses an engraved band. There are two models:

==== Model 001 ====
The Model 1 was announced on February 7, 1984, with first shipments planned for Q3 1984. It prints at 2000, 3000 or 3600 lpm. At announcement it is IBMs fastest ever impact printer. IBM claims it uses 46% less power and produce 26% less heat than the IBM 3211.

It comes standard with 132 print positions, but can optionally be upgraded to use 168 print positions allowing for two documents to be printed side by side. The band reportedly travels at 45 miles per hour, while the hammers move for only 30 microseconds for each row of characters.

There are six consumable items:

- Forms retention belts. This took 4 minutes to replace.
- Platen wear strip. This took 4 minutes to replace.
- Print band. This took 2 minutes to change.
- Printer ribbon. This took 2 minutes to replace.
- Ribbon shield. This took 4 minutes to replace.
- Vacuum cleaner bag, for the inbuilt vacuum cleaning system. This took 2 minutes to replace.

It operates in two modes:

- 3211 compatible mode
- 4248 mode

It has the following features:

- The Automatic Flight Time Compensation (AFTC) system electronically adjusted hammer delay times, meaning that no mechanical adjustments are needed. An operator can run the AFTC program manually and results are stored on the printer's inbuilt diskette.
- The Automatic Band Image Buffer (BIB) means the 4248 can read the band ID from the band and thus load the correct band image into the band image buffer as well as detect if a mismatch between the desired and fitted band exists.
- It can print OCR quality at 2200 LPM.
- It can underscore and multi-strike.
- It has a flashing operator attention light. IBM claim this is necessary as the printer is so quiet. IBM reported it is half as quiet as the IBM 3211.

At announcement it is intended to be channel attached to IBM 370/3148 and above, 44xx, 303x and 308x mainframes.

It is 152.5 cm (60.0 in) long, 122 cm (48 in) wide and 142 cm (56 in) high. It is 203 cm (80 in) high with the cover raised. It weighs 865 kg (1,907 lb) with stacker.

The model 001 was withdrawn on January 26, 1987. IBM stated the replacement product is the 4248–002.

==== Model 002 ====
The Model 002 was announced on January 26, 1987, with planned availability in February, 1987. It features new hammer technology that allow it to print at 4000 lpm. It no longer needs platen wear strips and requires no preventative maintenance by an IBM Service Representative. IBM extended the warranty from 3 months to 12 months on the Model 001 and announced it as 12 months on the Model 002, on the basis it is so reliable.

The Model 002 was withdrawn on December 15, 1992. IBM stated the replacement product was the 6262–022, with the proviso that two 6262-022s may be needed to replace one 4248–002.

=== IBM 6262 ===
The 6262 is smaller and quieter than earlier printers. For instance it produces 57 dB versus 64 dB for the 4245.

- It uses 64% of the footprint compared to the 4245-012 or 4245–020.
- It operates at 58 dB versus 64 dB for the 4245–020.

It offers three types of print band which affected speed based on the number of characters in the character set:

| Character Set | Model x22 (lpm) |
|---|---|
| 48 | 2200 |
| 64 | 1840 |
| 94/96 | 1410 |

There are several models:

IBM 6262 Models
| | Attachment | Speed (lpm) | Announced | Planned Availability | Withdrawal Date | Width (mm) | Depth (mm) | Height (mm) | Weight (kg) |
|---|---|---|---|---|---|---|---|---|---|
| A12 | parallel/Serial | 1200 | August 28, 1990 | August, 1990 | September 14, 1994 | 1000 | 850 | 1360 | 290 |
| D12 | Coax | 1200 | February 2, 1988 | March 25, 1988 | September 14, 1994 | 1000 | 850 | 1360 | 290 |
| P12 | Dataproducts Parallel | 1200 | October 24, 1989 | November 24, 1989 | September 14, 1994 | 1000 | 850 | 1360 | 290 |
| T12 | Twinax | 1200 | February 2, 1988 | March 25, 1988 | September 14, 1994 | 1000 | 850 | 1360 | 290 |
| 014 | Channel | 1400 | February 2, 1988 | July 1988 | September 14, 1994 | 1000 | 850 | 1360 | 301 |
| A14 | parallel/Serial | 1400 | August 28, 1990 | August, 1990 | September 14, 1994 | 1000 | 850 | 1360 | 301 |
| D14 | Coax | 1400 | February 2, 1988 | July 1988 | September 14, 1994 | 1000 | 850 | 1360 | 301 |
| P14 | Dataproducts Parallel | 1400 | October 24, 1989 | November 24, 1989 | September 14, 1994 | 1000 | 850 | 1360 | 301 |
| T14 | Twinax | 1400 | February 2, 1988 | July 1988 | September 14, 1994 | 1000 | 850 | 1360 | 301 |
| 022 | Channel | 2200 | October 24, 1989 | November 24, 1989 | June 30, 1999 | 1000 | 850 | 1360 | 360 |
| A22 | parallel/Serial | 2200 | August 28, 1990 | August, 1990 | June 30, 1999 | 1000 | 850 | 1360 | 360 |
| D22 | Coax | 2200 | October 24, 1989 | November 24, 1989 | June 30, 1999 | 1000 | 850 | 1360 | 360 |
| P22 | Dataproducts Parallel | 2200 | October 24, 1989 | November 24, 1989 | June 30, 1999 | 1000 | 850 | 1360 | 360 |
| T22 | Twinax | 2200 | October 24, 1989 | November 24, 1989 | June 30, 1999 | 1000 | 850 | 1360 | 360 |

==== Replacement product ====
The replacement product for the 6262 was effectively the IBM 6400, which is not a hammer based printer. It instead was a line matrix printer.

== Universal Character Set feature ==
Starting with the 1403 model 2 attached to the IBM 2821 Control Unit, most of IBM's hammer-based printers (Note: The 370, 407, 716, 717, 718, 719, 720, 730 and 7400 do not support UCS. The 3270 printers (e.g. 3284, 3286, 3287, 3288, 4224) did not support UCS, however, some of them supported Programmed Symbol Sets (PSS), a similar facility with a very different interface.) were equipped with the Universal Character Set (UCS) feature.

IBM provided software support for impact printers with interchangeable print elements, e.g., chains, trains. The control unit has a UCS buffer (Note: 240 bytes for the 2821) containing the code point for each position of the print element. The control unit can optionally fold lower case letters to upper case for printing elements that have no lower case letters.

The software can load the UCS buffer with the UCS Load commands (CCW operation codes) 'FB'x (no folding) and 'F3'x (folding).
