= Standard Modular System =

IBM computer circuit board, circa 1960

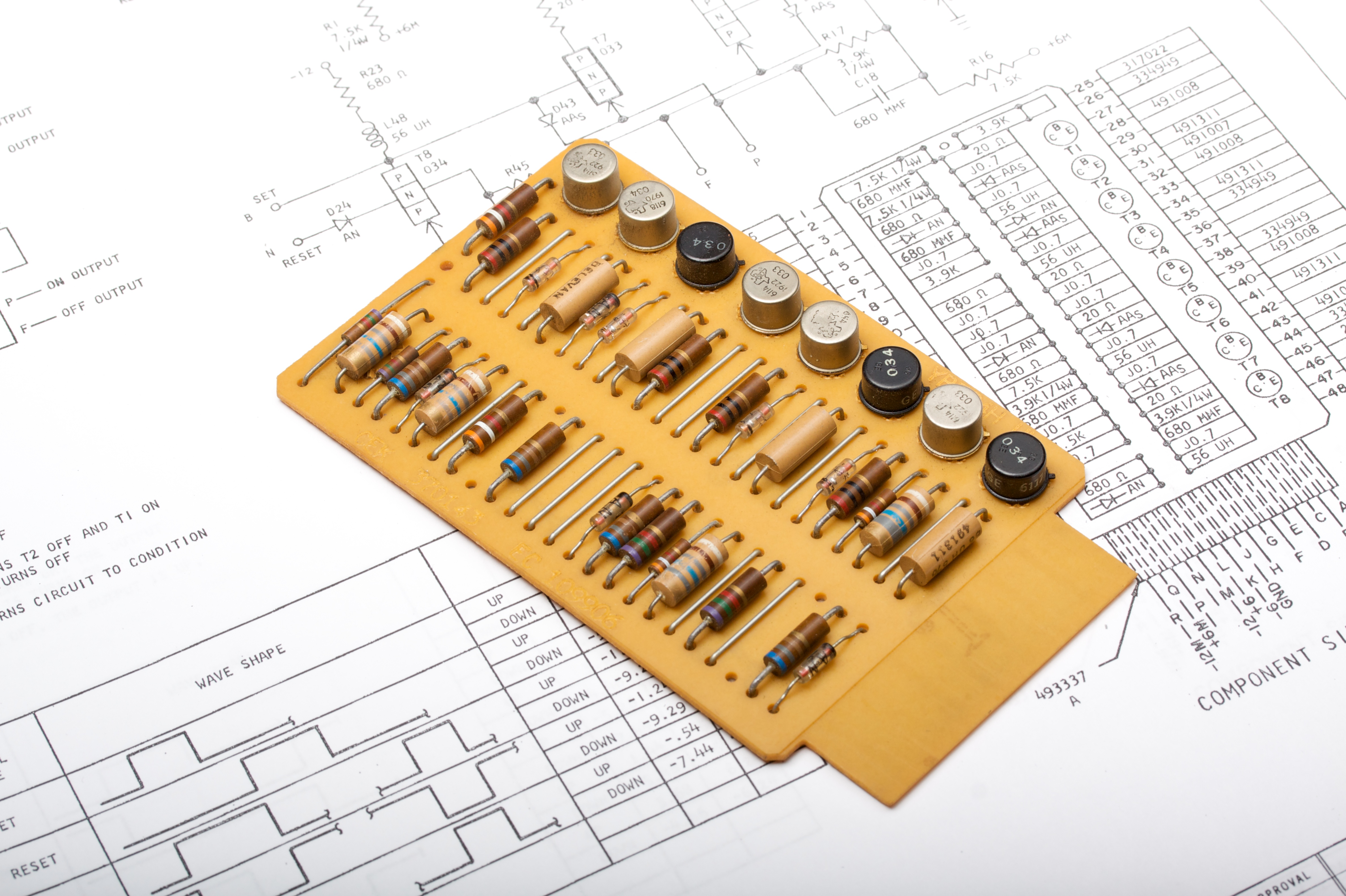
A single-width SMS card

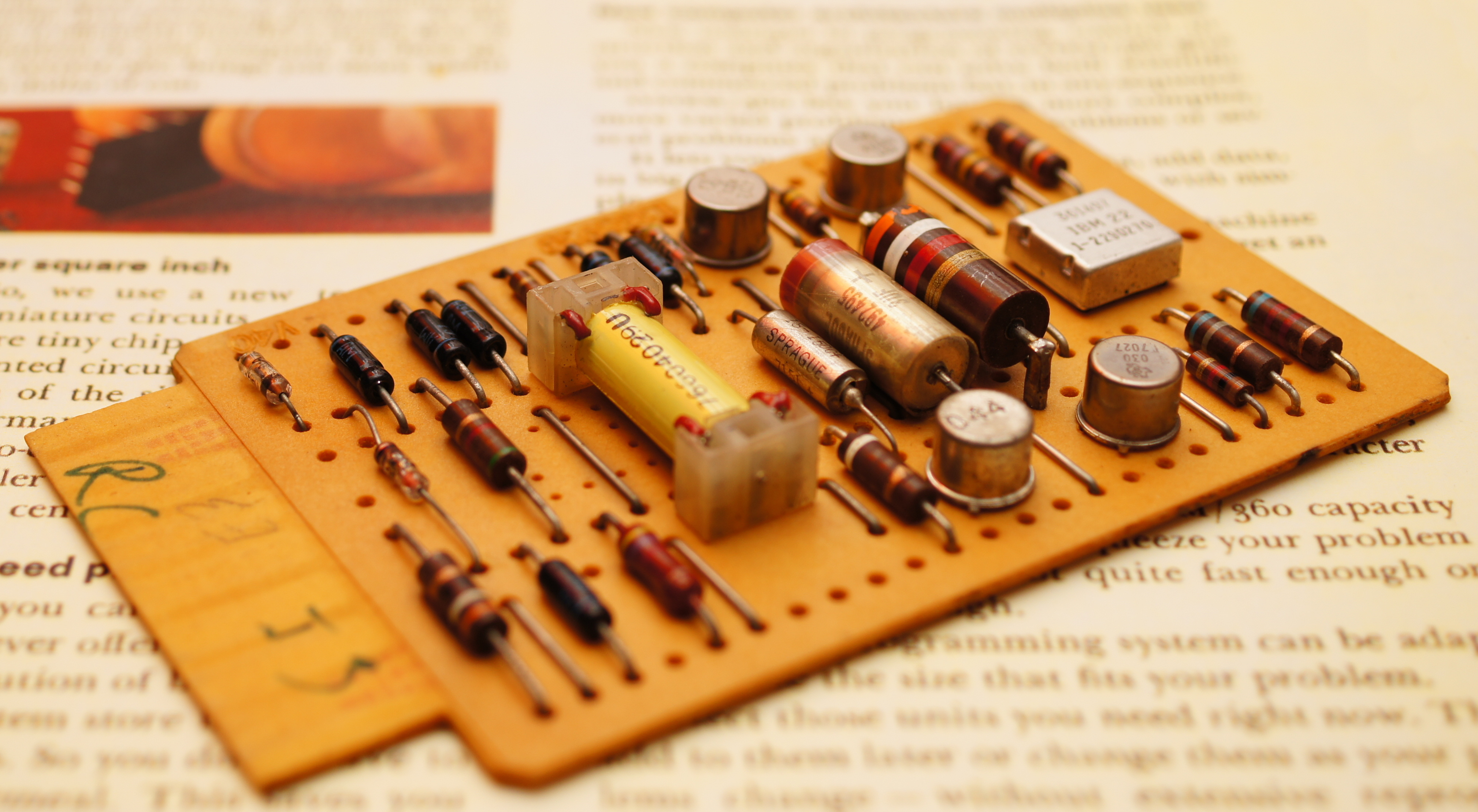
An SMS card with an SLT device at far right (the square metal piece)

The Standard Modular System (SMS) is a system of standard transistorized circuit boards and mounting racks developed by IBM in the late 1950s, originally for the IBM 7030 Stretch. They were used throughout IBM's second-generation computers, peripherals, the 7000 series, the 1400 series, and the 1620. SMS was superseded by Solid Logic Technology (SLT) introduced with System/360 in 1964, however they remained in use with legacy systems through the 1970s.

== Overview ==
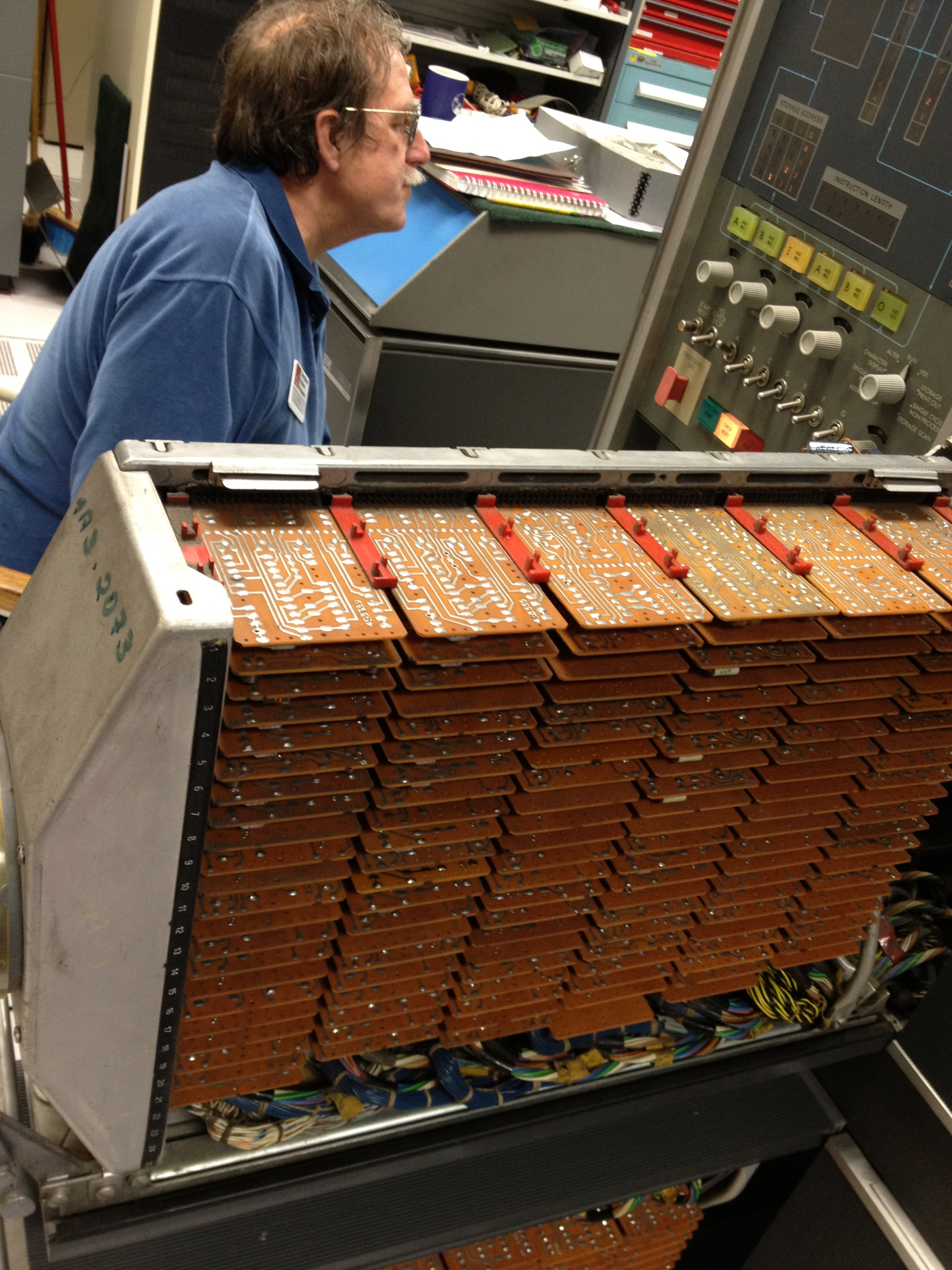
SMS cards in an IBM 1401 mid-sized computer

Many IBM peripheral devices that are part of System/360, but were adapted from second-generation designs, continued to use SMS circuitry instead of the newer SLT. These included the 240x-series tape drives and controllers, the 2540 card reader/punch and 1403N1 printer, and the 2821 Integrated Control Unit for the 1403 and 2540. A few SMS cards used in System/360 peripheral devices even have SLT-type hybrid ICs mounted on them (see right).

SMS cards are constructed of individual discrete components mounted on single-sided paper-epoxy printed circuit boards. Single-width cards are 2.5 inches wide by 4.5 inches tall by 0.056 inches thick, with a 16-pin gold plated edge connector. Double-width cards are 5.375 inches wide by 4.5 inches tall, with two 16-pin gold plated edge connectors. Contacts are labeled A–R (skipping I and O) on the first edge connector, and S–Z, 1–8 on the second.

The cards are plugged into a card-cage back-plane and edge connector contacts connected to wire wrap pins. All interconnections are made with wire-wrapped connections, except for power bus lines. The back-plane wire-wrap connections were mostly made at the factory with automated equipment, but the wire-wrap technology facilitated field-installation of engineering changes by customer engineers.

Some card types can be customized via a "program cap" (a double-rail metal jumper bar with 15 connections) that could be cut to change the circuit configuration. Card types with a "program cap" came with it precut for the standard configuration and if a customer engineer needed a different configuration in the field he could make additional cuts as needed. This feature was intended to reduce the number of different card types a customer engineer had to carry with him to the customer's site.

The card type is a two- to four-letter code embossed on the card (e.g., MX, ALQ). If the card has a "program cap" the code is split into a two-letter card type code and a two-letter "cap connection" code (e.g., AK ZZ).

When SMS was originally developed, IBM anticipated a set of a couple hundred standard card types would be all that would be needed, making design, manufacture and servicing simpler. Unfortunately that proved far too optimistic as the number of different SMS card types soon grew to well over 2500. Part of the reason for the growth was that multiple digital logic families were implemented (ECL, RTL, DTL, etc.) as well as analog circuits, to meet the requirements of the many different systems in which the cards were used.

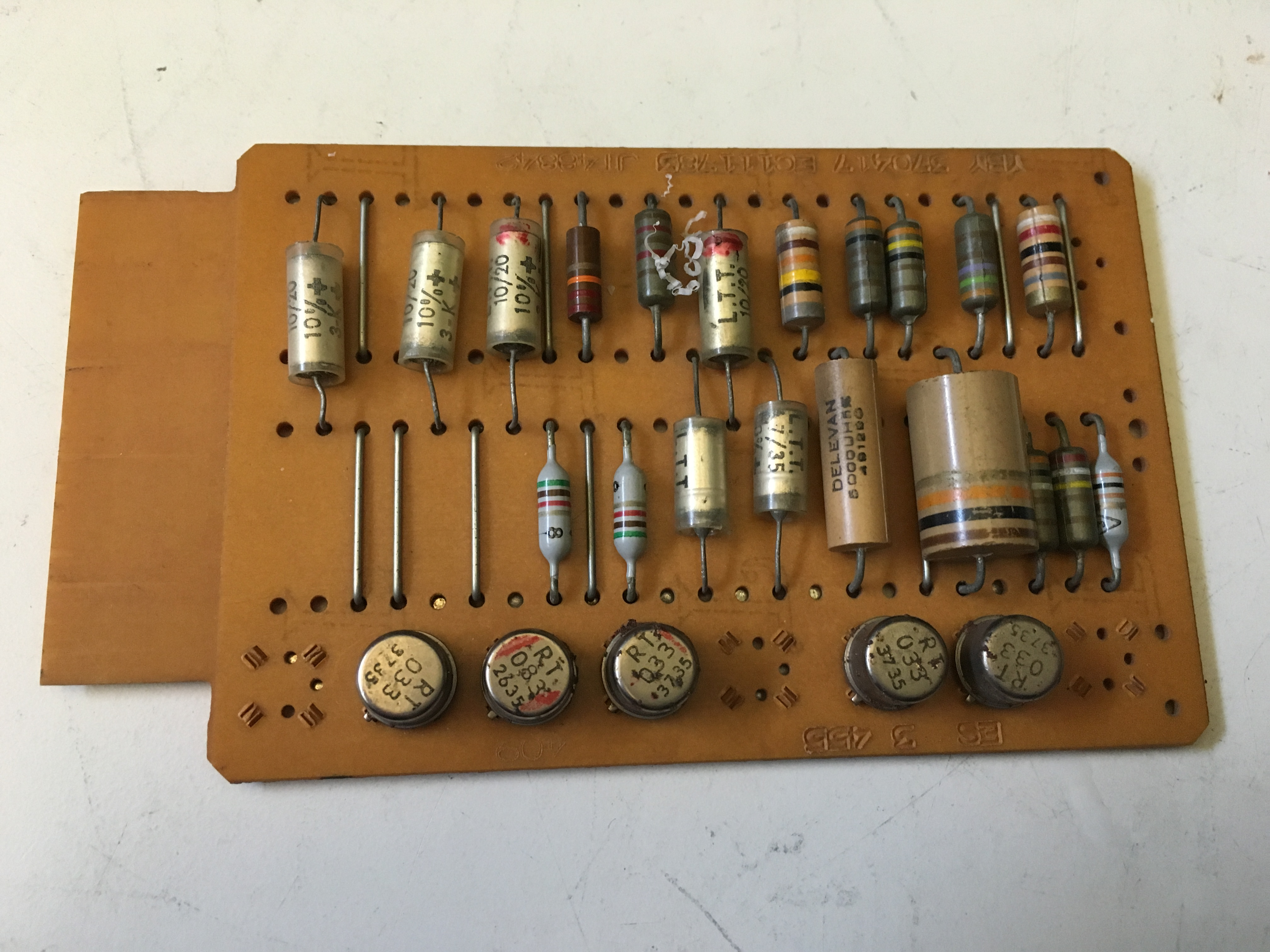
SMS card from an IBM 1401

Circuit side of same SMS card

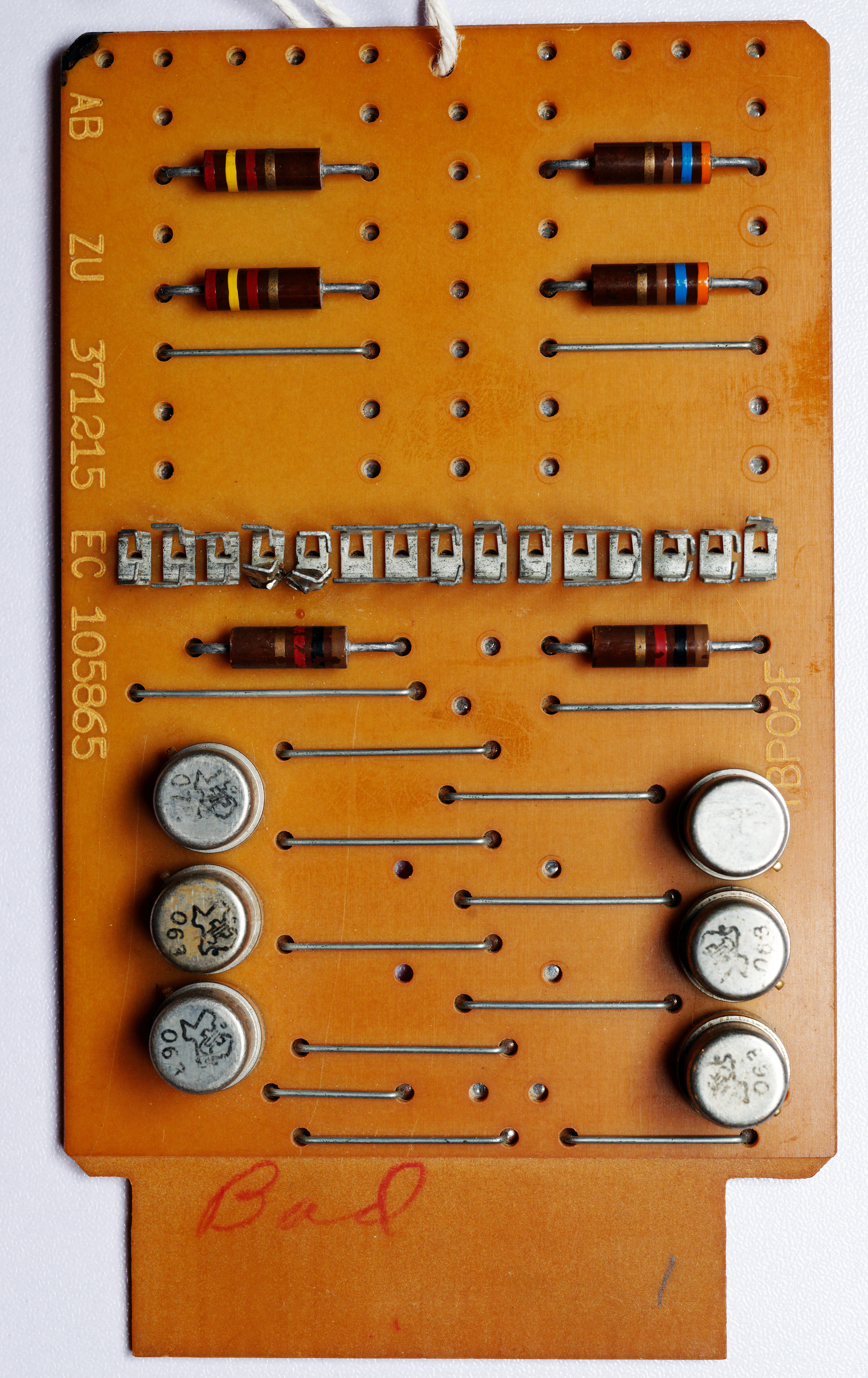
SMS card, front

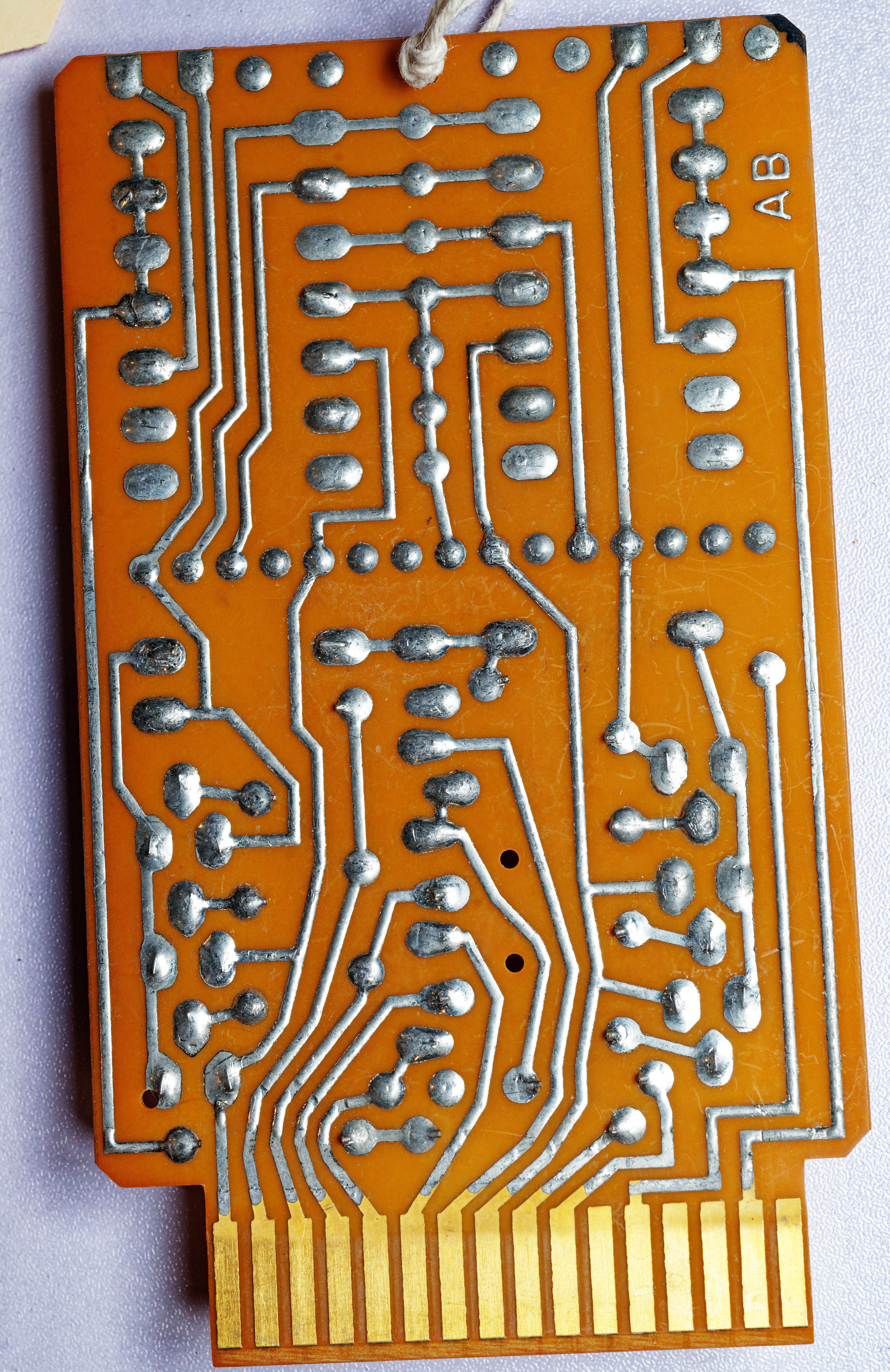
SMS card, back

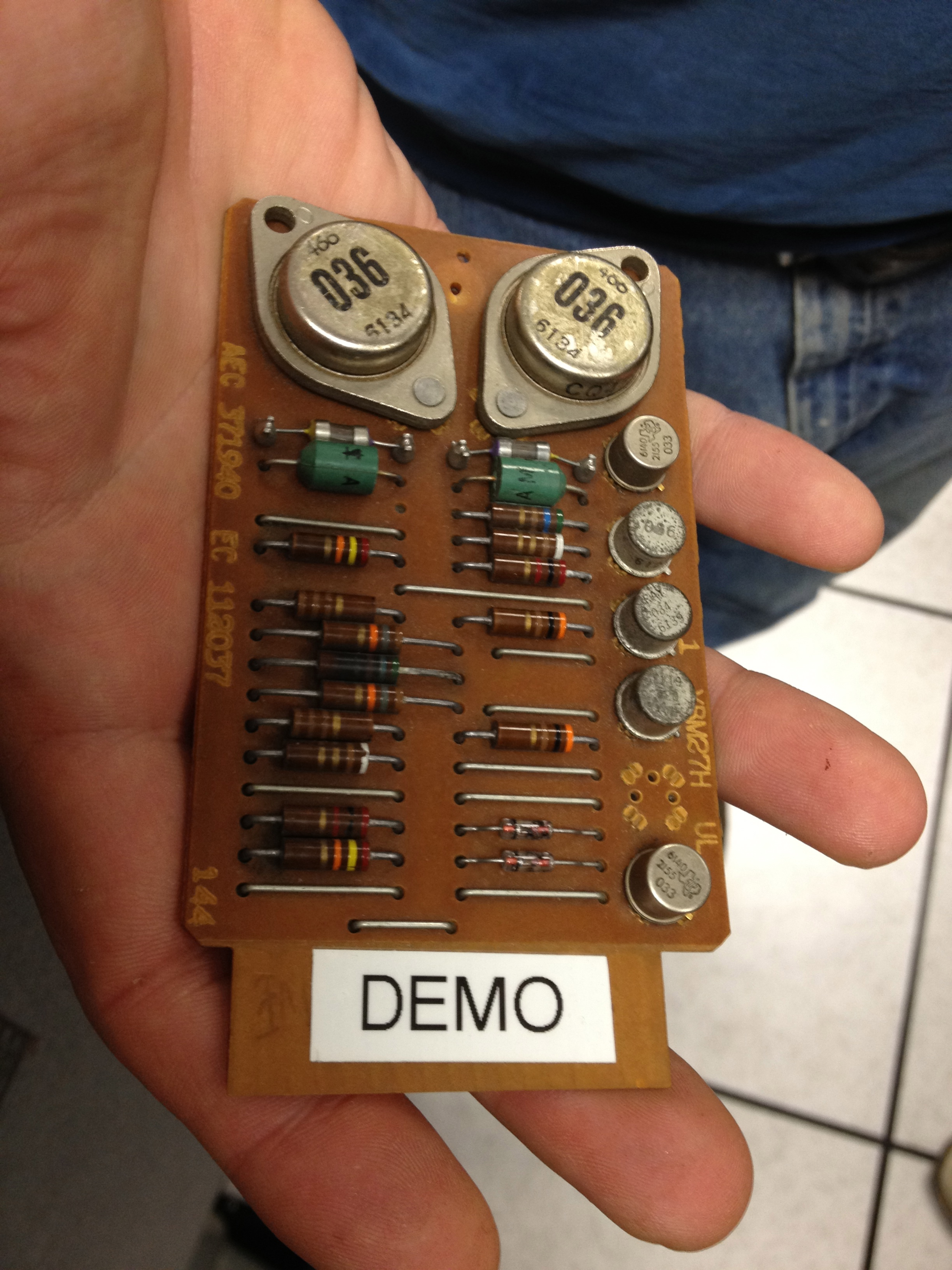
SMS card from an IBM 1401

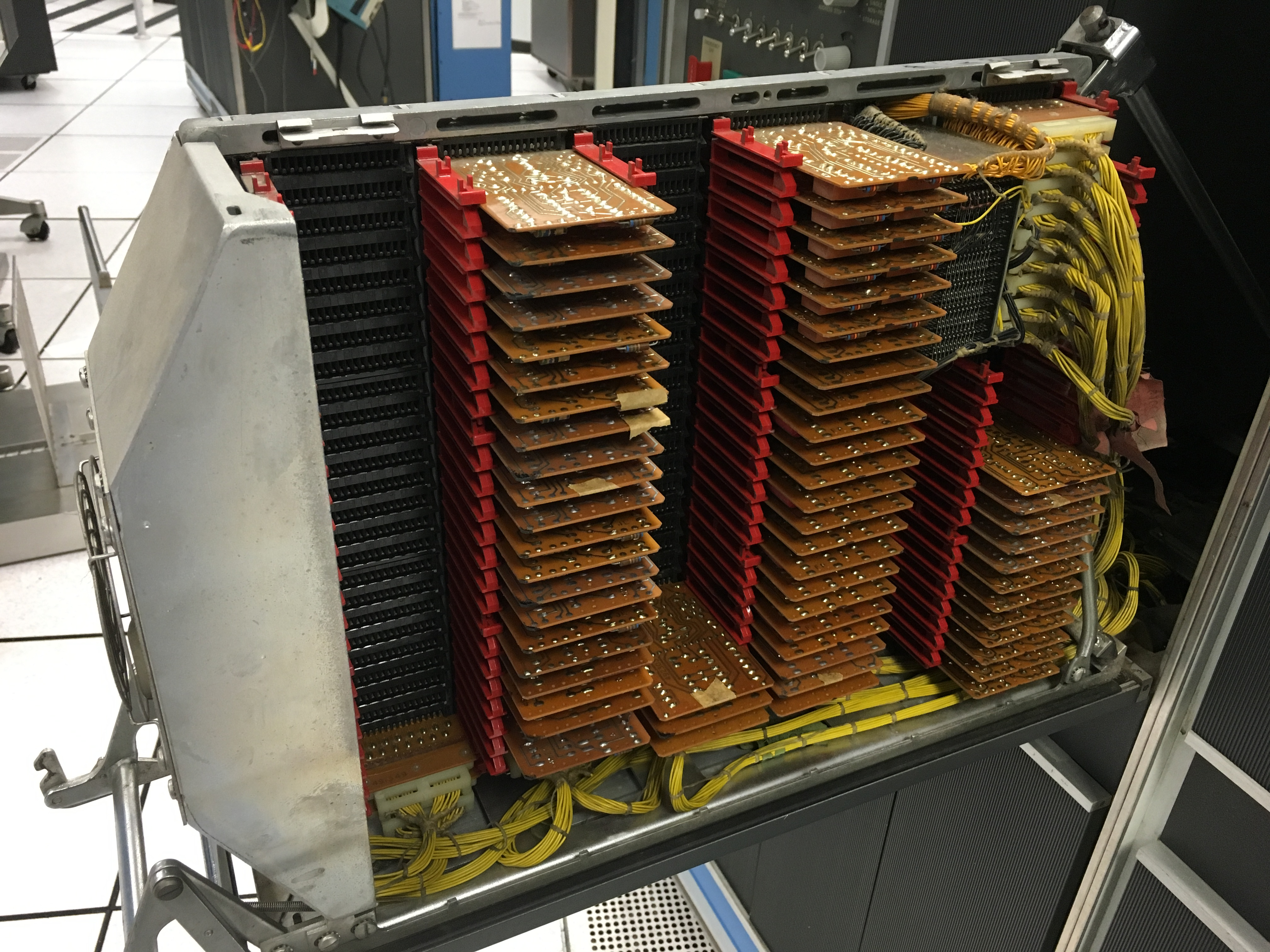
IBM 1401 card cage

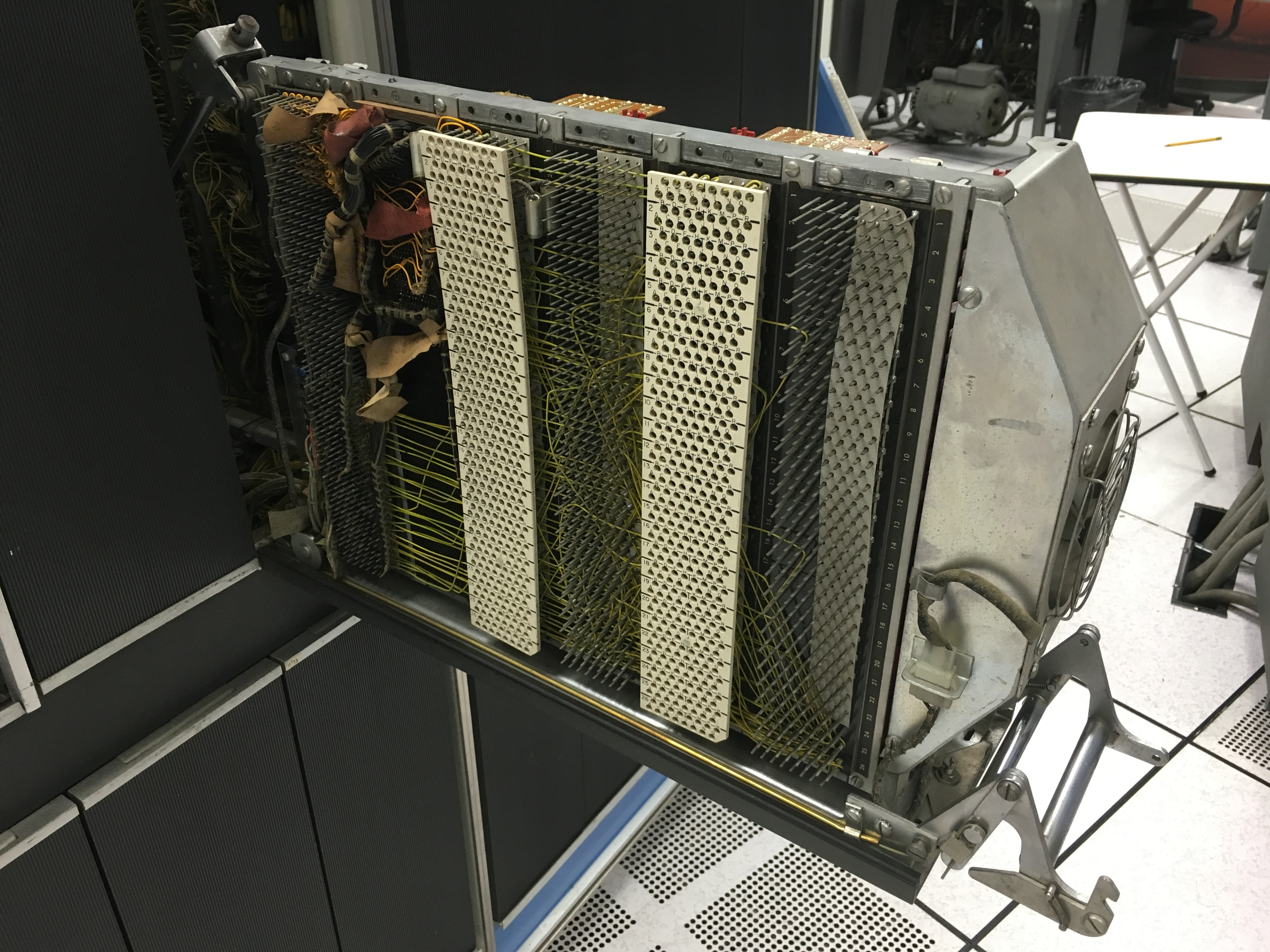
Wire wrapped backplane the same 1401 card cage

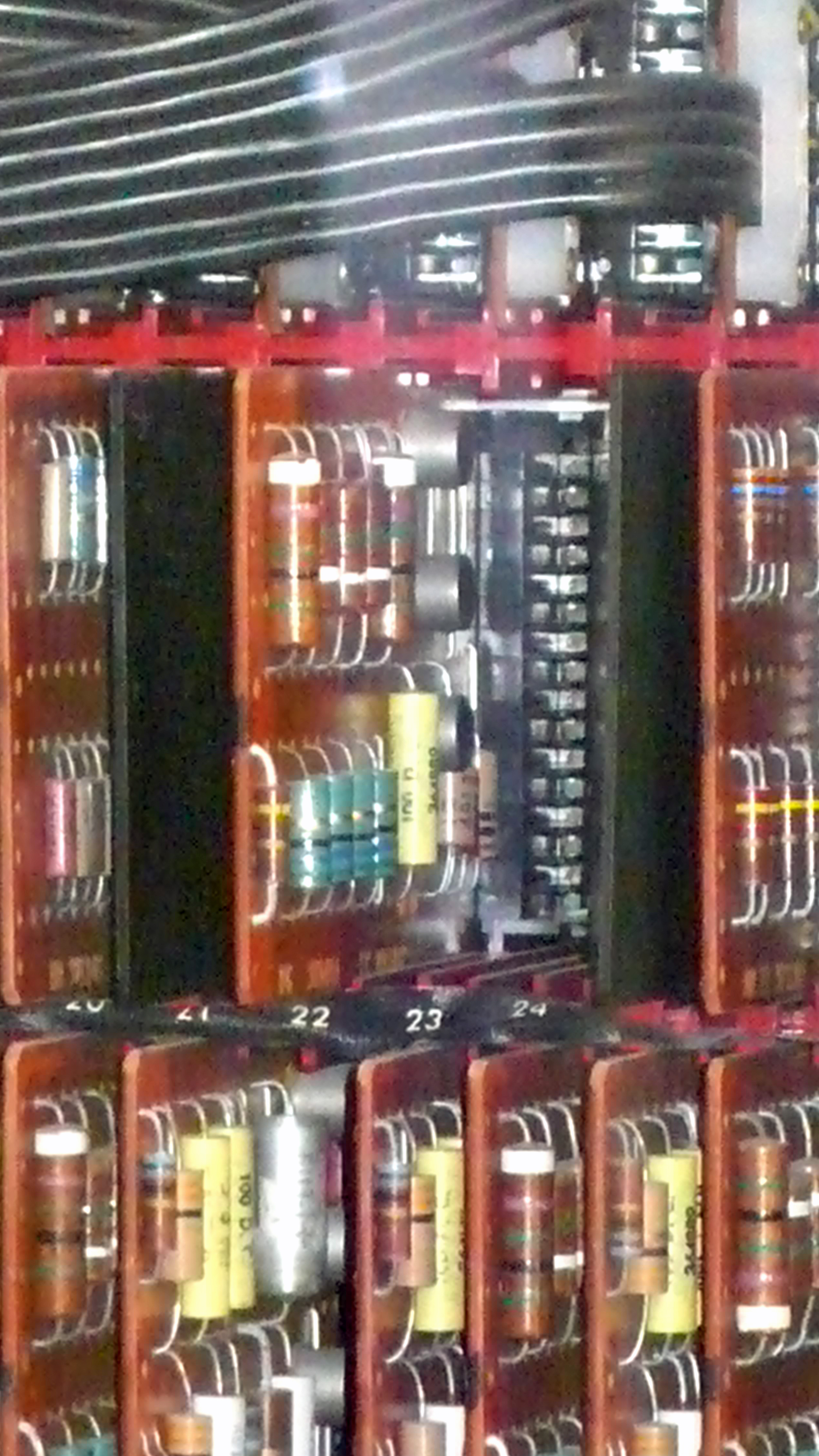
IBM 7070 card cage

== See also ==
- IBM Solid Logic Technology
- Flip-Chip module
- DEC System Module
