= IBM 1403 =

High speed line printer, introduced in 1959 and used into the 1970s

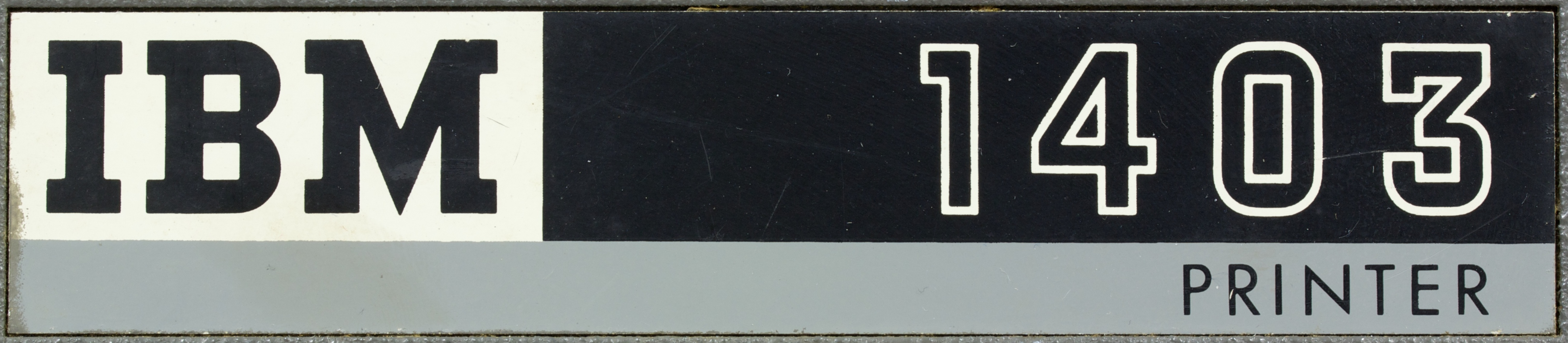

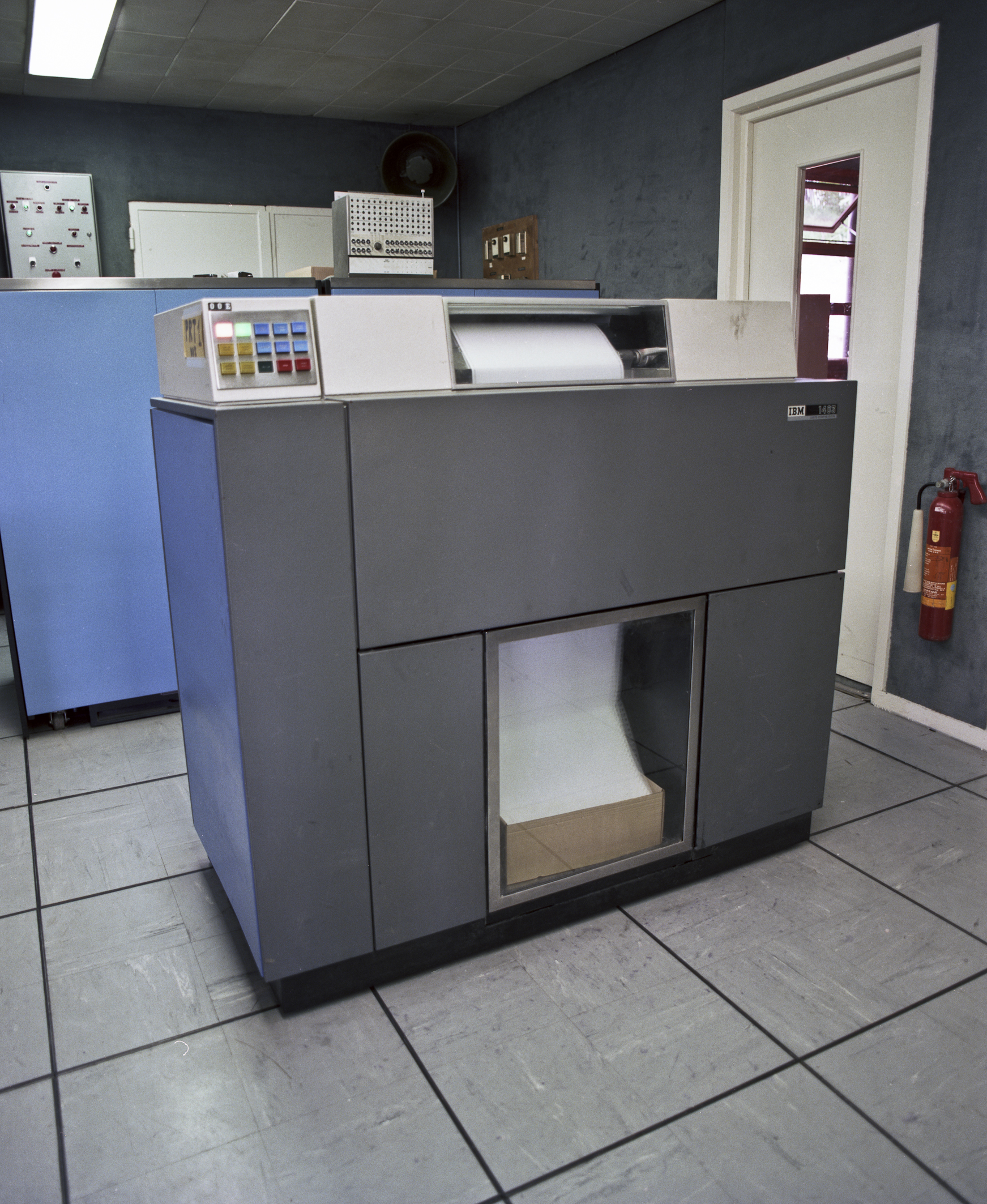
- Latest 1403 printer
- Developer: IBM
- Type: Line printer (Chain printer)
- Released: 1959; 67 years ago
- Discontinued: 1983
- Predecessor: IBM 407, IBM 716
- Successor: IBM 3203, IBM 3211
- Related: IBM 1132, IBM 1443

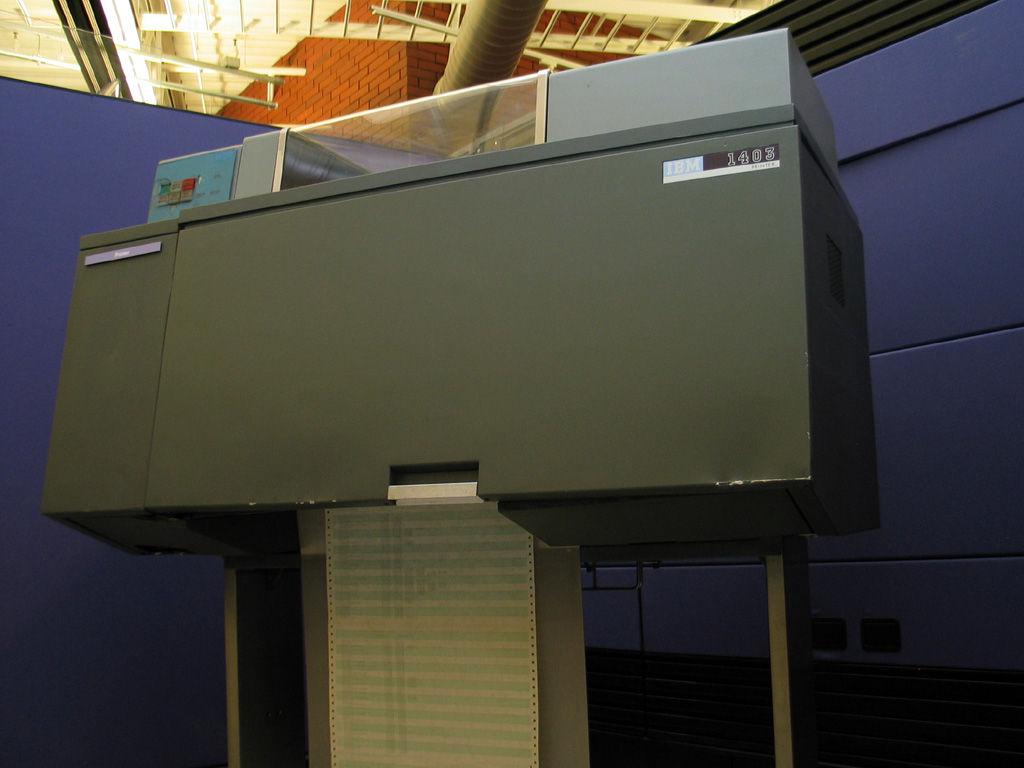
IBM 1403 at the Computer History Museum

The IBM 1403 line printer was introduced as part of the IBM 1401 computer in 1959 and had an especially long life in the IBM product line.

== Description ==
The original model can print 600 lines of text per minute and can skip blank lines at up to 75 inches per second (190 cm/s), while the model 3 can print at up to 1400 lines per minute. The standard model has 120 print positions. An additional 12 positions are available as an option. A print chain with up to 15 copies of the character set spins horizontally in front of the ribbon and paper. Hammers strike the paper from behind at exactly the right moment to print a character as it goes by. In later models, the print chain is replaced by a print train; print slugs instead of being mounted on a chain are placed in a track.

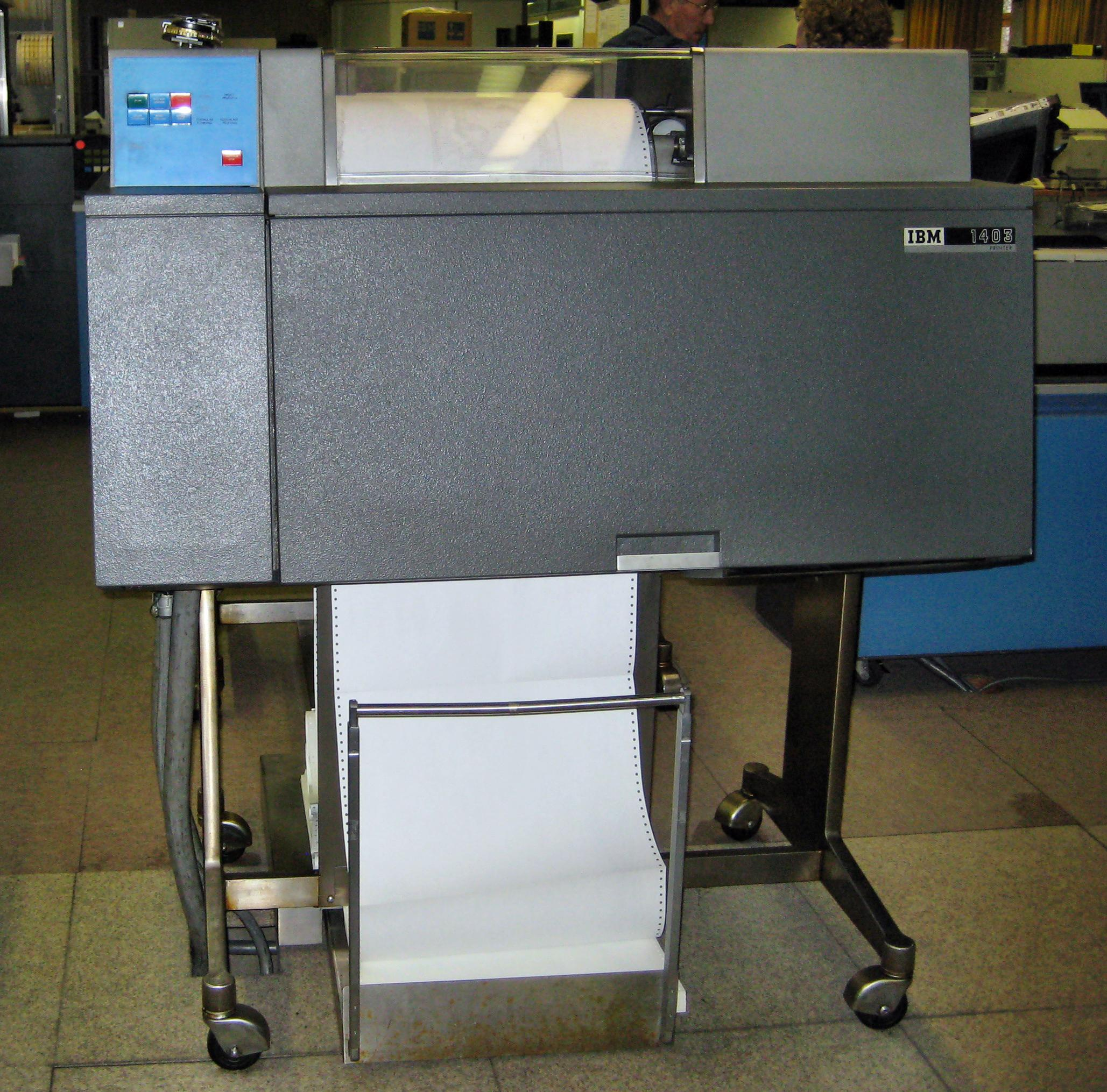
IBM 1403 in the "Haus zur Geschichte der IBM Datenverarbeitung" museum, Sindelfingen, Germany

The 1403 chain or train contains 240 characters, however numerous duplications allow a line to be printed in less than the 0.4 s required for one full rotation. The original standard "A" chain contains 48 different characters, repeated five times each. A "preferred character set" variant used in later models prints the same 48 characters, but varies the number of appearances: 10 digits appear eight times each, 26 upper-case letters appear four times each, and 12 special characters . , - * % $ / & # @ ⌑ ⧧ (Note: That last character, "record mark", is depicted as two horizontal lines crossed with one vertical line, like two vertically offset, overapping + signs, or like a differently proportioned "double dagger" symbol ‡. The most accurate representation is U+29E7 ⧧ THERMODYNAMIC, but that is missing from many fonts.) appear eight (first four), four (middle four) or two (last four characters) times each. Special chains or trains can be ordered for other character sets. Scientific users, for example, can use a chain that has the left parenthesis, the right parenthesis, and the plus sign in place of the per cent sign (%), the lozenge (⌑), (Note: The "lozenge" is the square lozenge (U+2311) that resembles an overstuffed pillow, not the diamond-shaped one. Some Unicode typefaces do not render it correctly at this low resolution.) and the ampersand (&). The numerics chain has 15 copies each of only 16 characters. The "T" chain for general text has two copies of 120 characters, including upper-and lower-case letters and numerous special symbols.

The ink ribbon is a long roll the width of the print area positioned between the print chain and the paper. The roll comes in two parts: the feeder roll and take-up roll. The roll is constantly wound and rewound during printing.

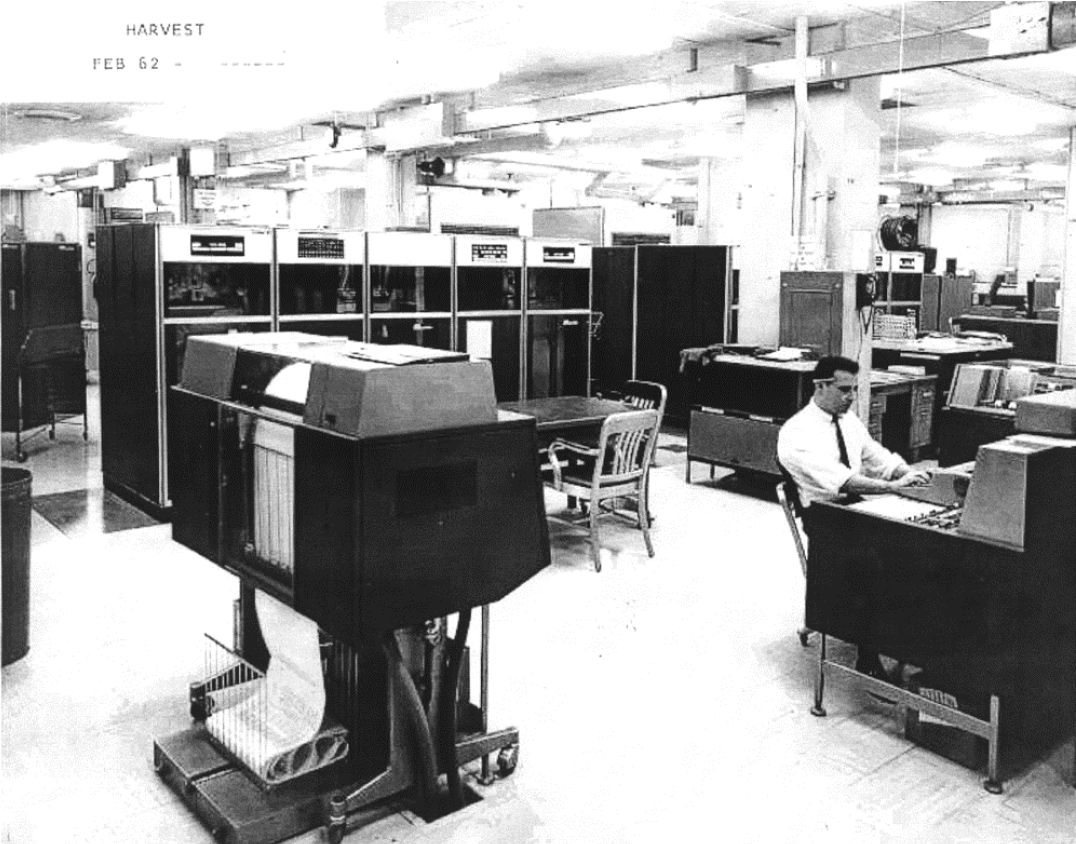
An IBM 1403, foreground, part of an IBM 7030 Harvest installation at the U.S. National Security Agency

Like most IBM printers of the era, the 1403 uses fan-folded paper with perforated edges for tractor feeding. A carriage control tape or, later, a buffer, under program control, (Note: This was system dependent.) specifies form length and the form line where printing on a new page is to begin so that paper of various sizes can be used.

The overstrike capability of the printer can be used to generate a wide range of grey-scale equivalents. Many images have been scanned, converted to text and therefore can be reproduced on the 1403, most notably the Mona Lisa.

These are noisy machines, especially when the cover is raised. It is possible to create text that uses the timing of the print hammers to generate desired frequencies and thus play recognizable music when that text is printed.

== History ==
Prior to the introduction of the model 1403, IBM printers utilized technology originally developed for their line of accounting machines. Models 402 and 405 use type bars. These are vertical bars, one for each print position. Each bar is one character wide with either the entire alphabet, including numerals and symbols, or just numerals and symbols only, molded into the front surface, in a single column. In printing, each bar is raised up until the correct character for that print position is opposite the paper, whereupon the bar is pushed toward the paper, so that the correct numeral or letter pressed against the ribbon, striking the paper much the way type slugs leave an impression on paper in a standard typewriter. This action is relatively slow, as it took time for each bar to be brought up into the correct position and then drop back down in preparation to print the next line.

In the model 407, each type bar is replaced with a type wheel, with the characters along the outside edge. To print, each wheel is rotated to the correct character position, then the entire wheel is pushed forward to strike the paper. This action is somewhat faster because the wheels are less massive than the bars and can be positioned more rapidly, allowing printing at up to 150 lines per minute. Although this is slow by later printing standards, the speed at which electromechanical accounting machines can read punched cards and perform their basic arithmetic functions means that no faster printing speeds are needed. The IBM 1132 was the last printer manufactured by IBM to use this technology.

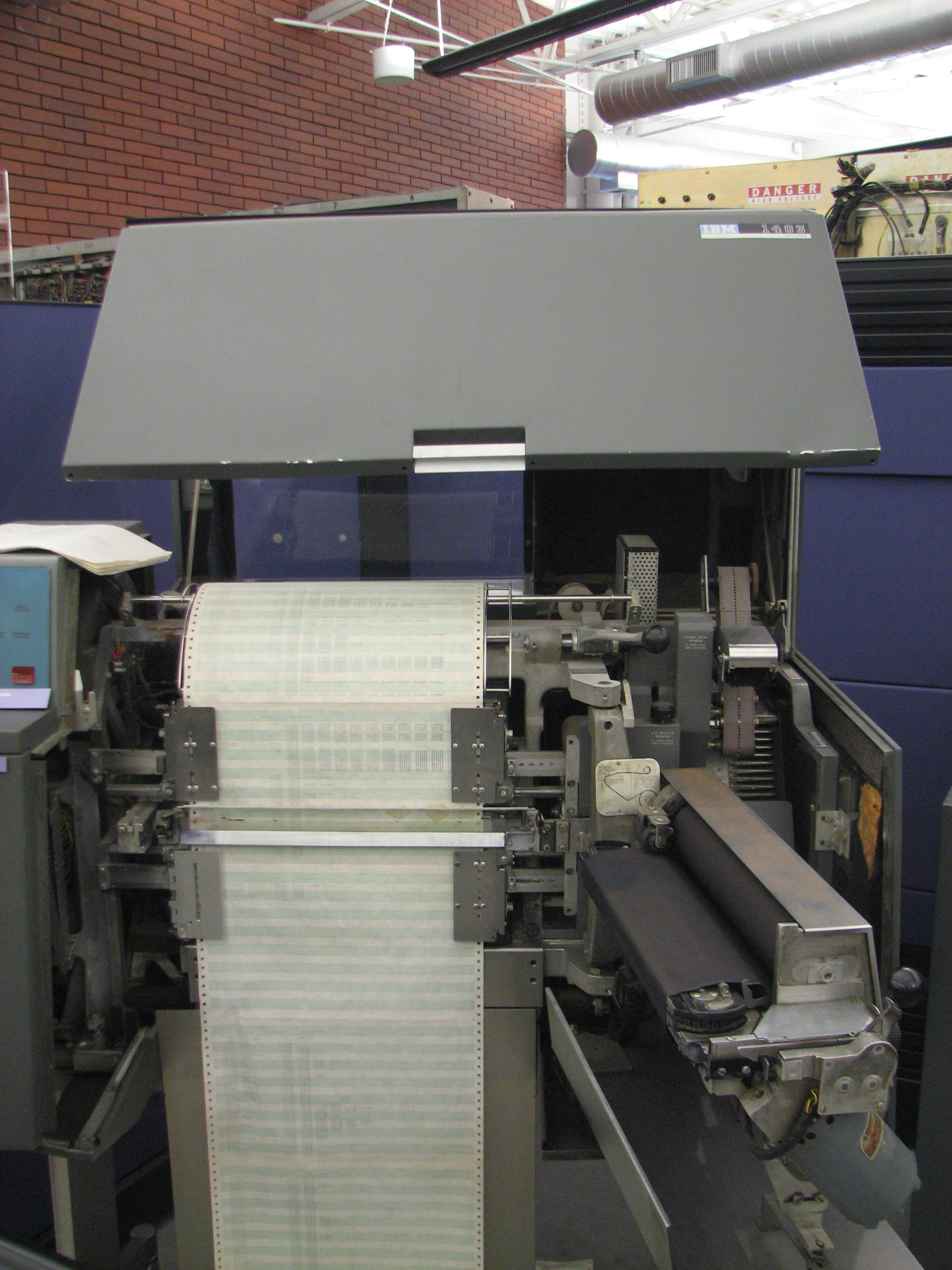
IBM 1403 printer opened up as it would be to change paper. The print chain is behind the wide black ribbon, hinged open to the right, which is the width of the paper. Also note carriage control tape in upper right.

When faster computers were developed, however, the speed of card reading, magnetic tape, and early disk drives, along with newer high speed transistorized circuits, means that processing can be done at a much higher speed, and a faster print mechanism is needed to match the resulting productivity. IBM's early computers, such as the IBM 701, were developed for higher speed calculation than was possible with earlier electromechanical calculating machines. They did not have a demand for high speed printing, as the results of massive calculations produced very little printed output. Around the time that the 1403 was introduced, IBM's line of computers had been largely divided into two lines, "scientific" and "business." However, as newer computers were being used for a greater variety of purposes, there was a need to print a greater variety of characters from a single device, including upper and lower case alphabets. With type bars and type wheels, changing character sets is impractical. The advent of the chain printer, as used in the 1403, allows the type chain assembly to be removed and replaced within a few minutes. With the cover open, the print unit is unlatched and swung open, the ribbon roll covering the front of the chain is removed, whereupon the print chain assembly can be unlatched and lifted out.

When it was first introduced, the 1401 computer system, of which the printer was a part, leased for $6,500 per month (equivalent to $54,000 in 2017) and IBM received 3,000 orders in the first month.

== Technology ==
Chain printing allows a single set of characters to pass horizontally across the front of the paper at high speed, with a ribbon the full width of the paper passing vertically between the chain and the front of the paper. Instead of pressing the characters toward the paper, individual type hammers behind the paper, one for each column on the page (120 or 132), push the paper from behind, causing the front of the paper at that spot to push forward into the ribbon with the character behind it, causing the paper to strike the character, rather than the other way around, as had been done in the past. Each hammer is moved by a powerful electromagnet, with its coil connected to a high current drive circuit, such that the hammer can be forced out to hit the paper within only a few milliseconds, at exactly the right time to strike the correct character on the chain as it came by.

The columns on the paper are spaced at the standard typewriter pitch of 10 characters per inch, 0.1″ per column. The characters on the chain are spaced 0.1505″ apart, so that for each 0.001″ movement of the chain, a new character aligns with a print column. Moving at 7.5 feet per second, one hammer might fire each 11.1 μs, but they were never exactly simultaneous.

=== Character set ===
Starting with the 1403 model 2 attached to the IBM 2821 Control Unit, most of IBM's hammer-based printers (Note: The 370, 407, 716, 717, 718, 719, 720, 730 and 7400 do not support UCS. The 3270 printers (e.g. 3284, 3286, 3287, 3288, 4224) did not support UCS, however, some of them supported Programmed Symbol Sets (PSS), a similar facility with a very different interface.) were equipped with the Universal Character Set (UCS) feature.

IBM provided software support for impact printers with interchangeable print elements, e.g., chains, trains. The control unit has a UCS buffer (Note: 240 bytes for the 2821) containing the code point for each position of the print element. The control unit can optionally fold lower case letters to upper case for printing elements that have no lower case letters.

The software can load the UCS buffer with the UCS Load commands (CCW operation codes) 'FB'x (no folding) and 'F3'x (folding).

== Models ==
The IBM 1403 has the following models:

- Model 1: 100 print positions, maximum of 600 lines per minute, or 1285 with the Numerical Print Special Feature.
- Model 2: 132 print positions, maximum of 600 lines per minute, or 1285 with the Numerical Print Special Feature, or 750 with Universal Character Set.
- Model 3: 132 print positions, maximum of 1100 lines per minute, or 1400 with the Preferred or Universal Character Sets.
- Model 4: 100 print positions, maximum of 465 lines per minute.
- Model 5: 132 print positions, maximum of 465 lines per minute.
- Model 6: 120 print positions, maximum of 340 lines per minute, single-carriage.
- Model 7: 120 print positions, maximum of 600 lines per minute, single-carriage.
- Model N1: 132 print positions, maximum of 1100 lines per minute, or 1400 with Universal Character Set. The model N1 has a power-driven cover that reaches the floor to decrease noise.

Only models 2, 3, 7 and N1 can be attached to the IBM System/360 and its successors. Attachment is generally by means of the IBM 2821 Control Unit, but some 360 models include an integrated control unit for direct 1403 connection.

Only the Model 6 (340 LPM) or the Model 7 (600 LPM) can be attached to an IBM 1130.

== IBM 1404 ==
The 1404 printer is an IBM impact printer with "all the basic features of the IBM 1403 Printer," with the added ability to print on card documents, such as punched cards.

The 1404 can print on continuous forms at 600 lines per minute, and on cards at 800 cards per minute. The mechanism can handle cards ranging from 51 columns to a full 80 columns, and can print cards two at a time. Up to 25 lines can be printed on a card. The printer can also interpret cards, that is, read the card and print what was punched.

The 1404 was originally introduced in 1960 as a peripheral for the IBM 1401 computing system. It was later able to attach to a System/360 through an IBM 2821 control unit.

== IBM 1416 ==
The IBM 1416 is an interchangeable train cartridge introduced with the 1403-N1 and also used with the IBM 3203. This means instead of using a chain of linked characters, the printer uses a train of unlinked characters. The cartridge allows the operator to change the font and/or character set arrangement being used by the printer. It is also possible to create a custom train with unique characters. Note that while the IBM 1403 Models 2 and 7 do offer a feature known as the Interchangeable Train Cartridge Adapter, which allows the operator to easily remove and insert a chain cartridge with a different font or character set arrangement, this feature does not have a separate machine type.

== Gallery ==
Side view of 1403 with cover open, showing carriage control tape

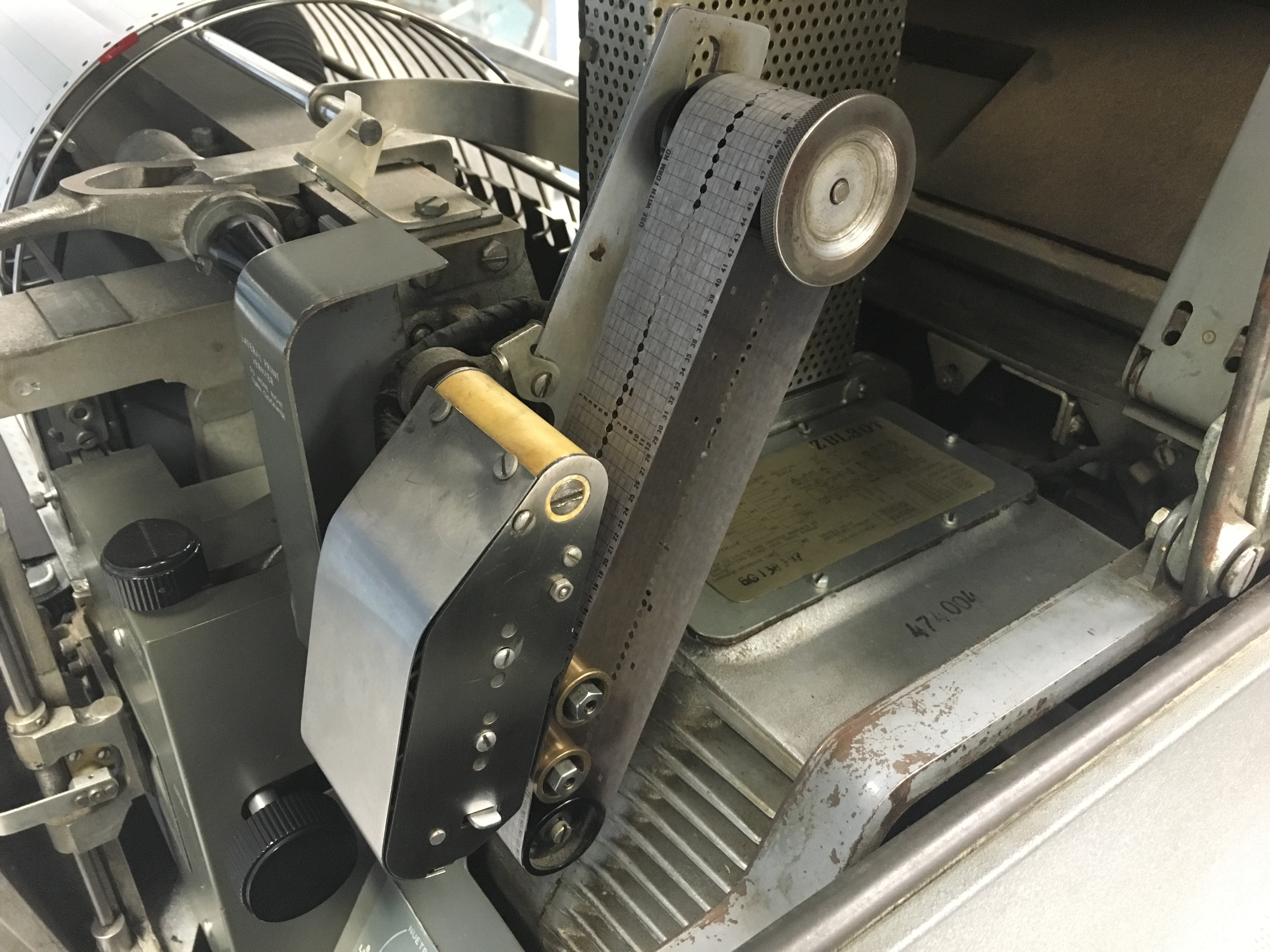
Carriage control tape loop used to control rapid motion to a particular line in a page, such as top of new page

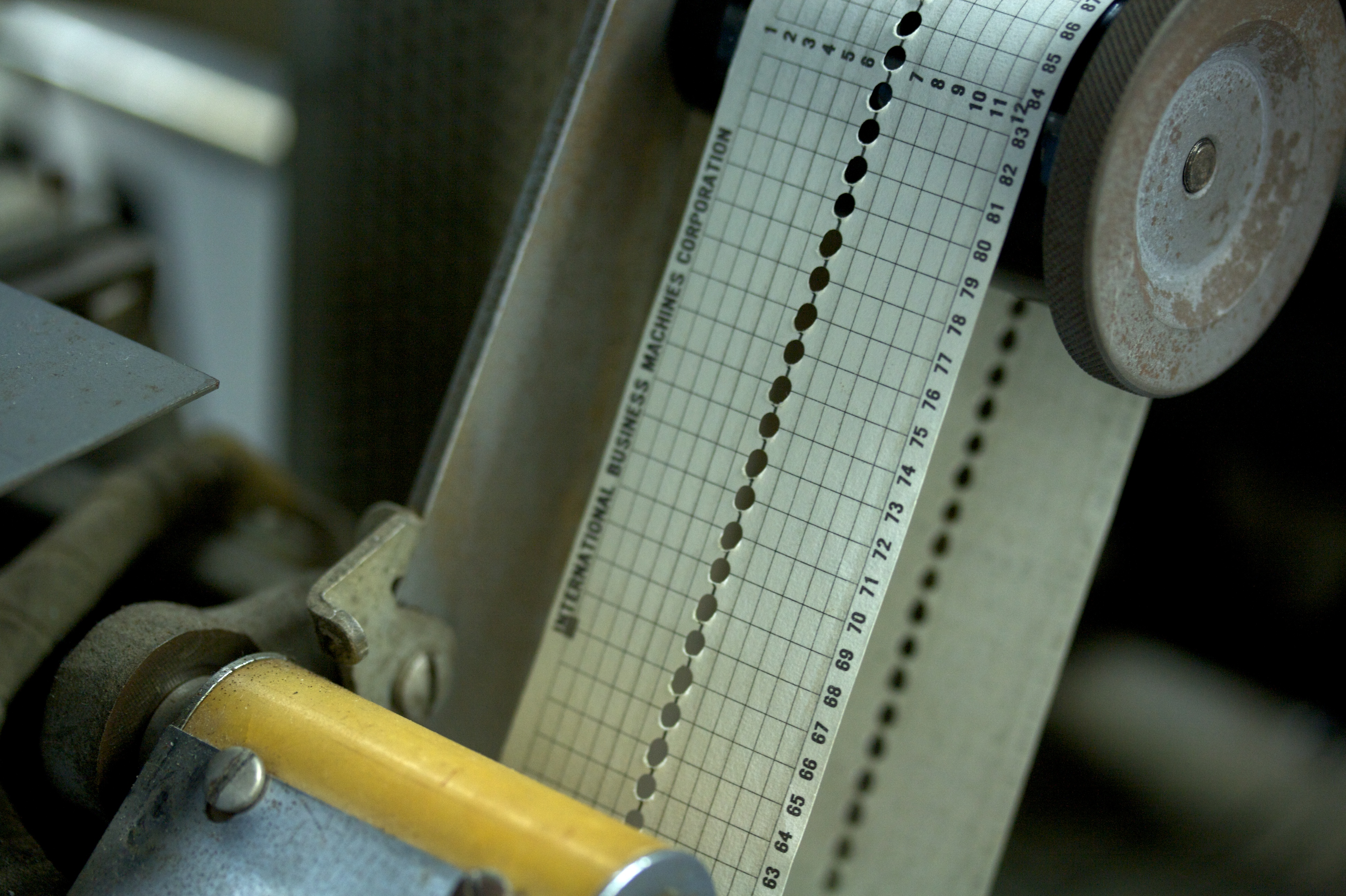
closeup of carriage control tape

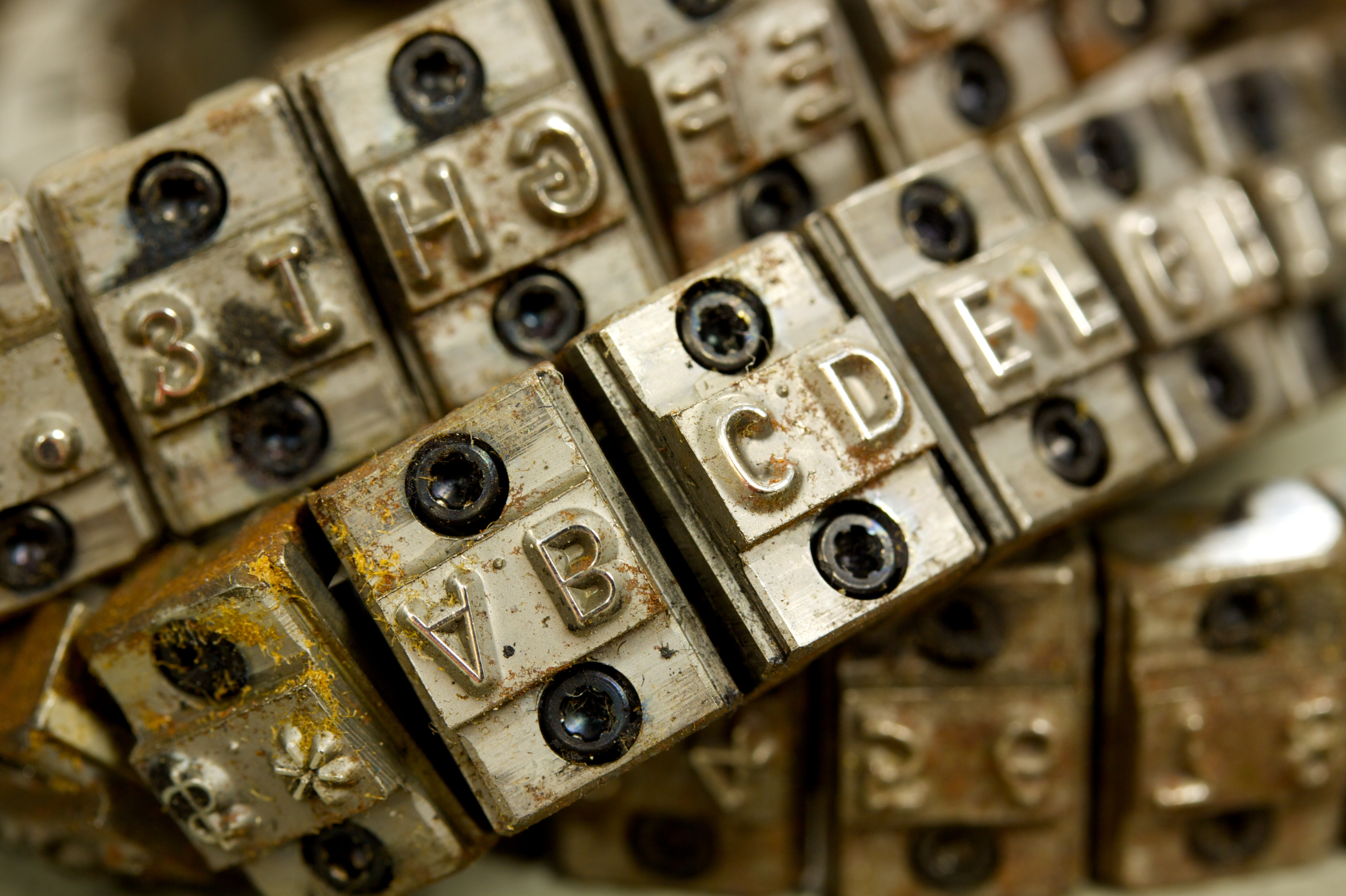
Portion of 1403 print chain

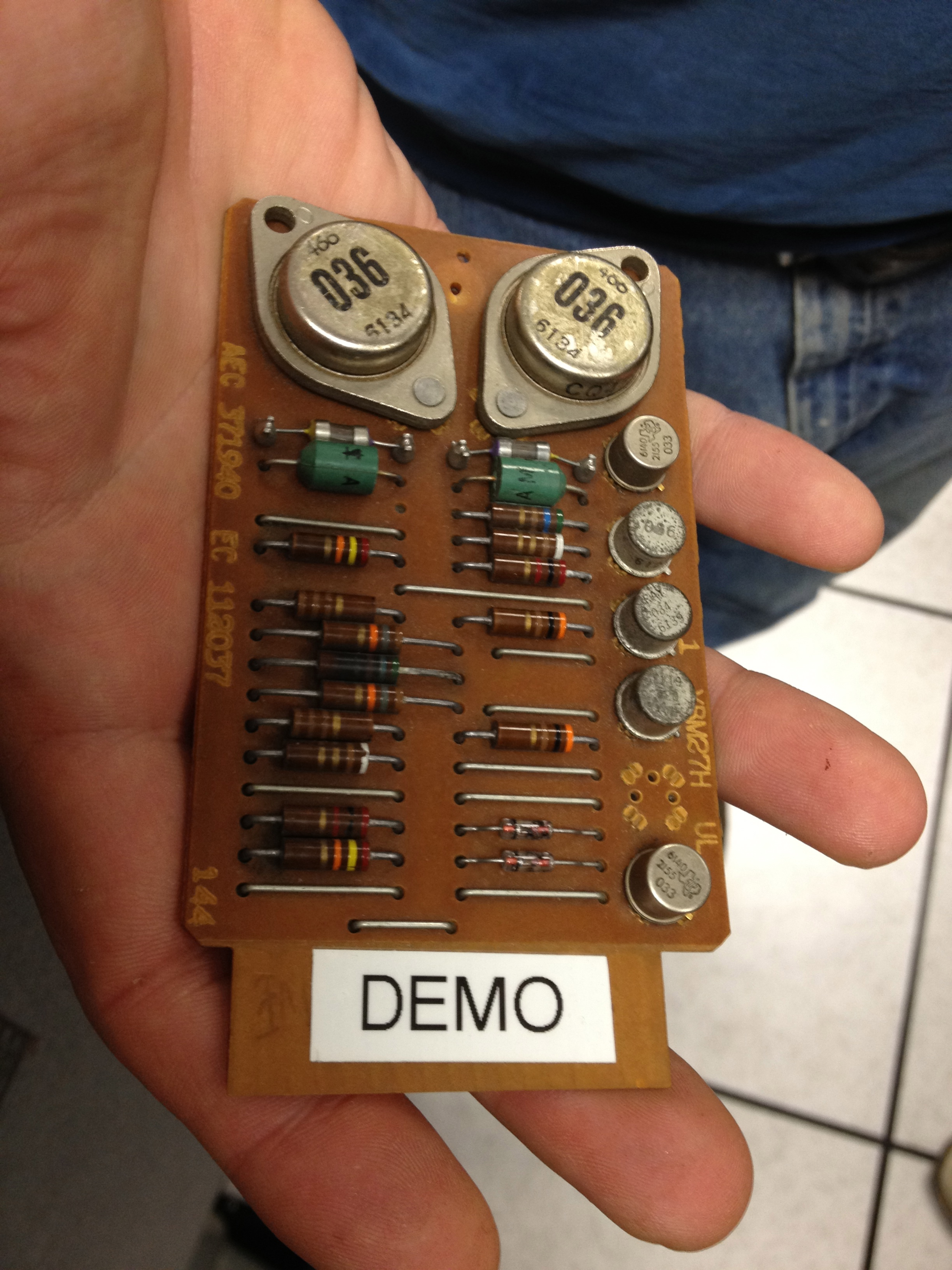
SMS card used to drive 1403 print hammers

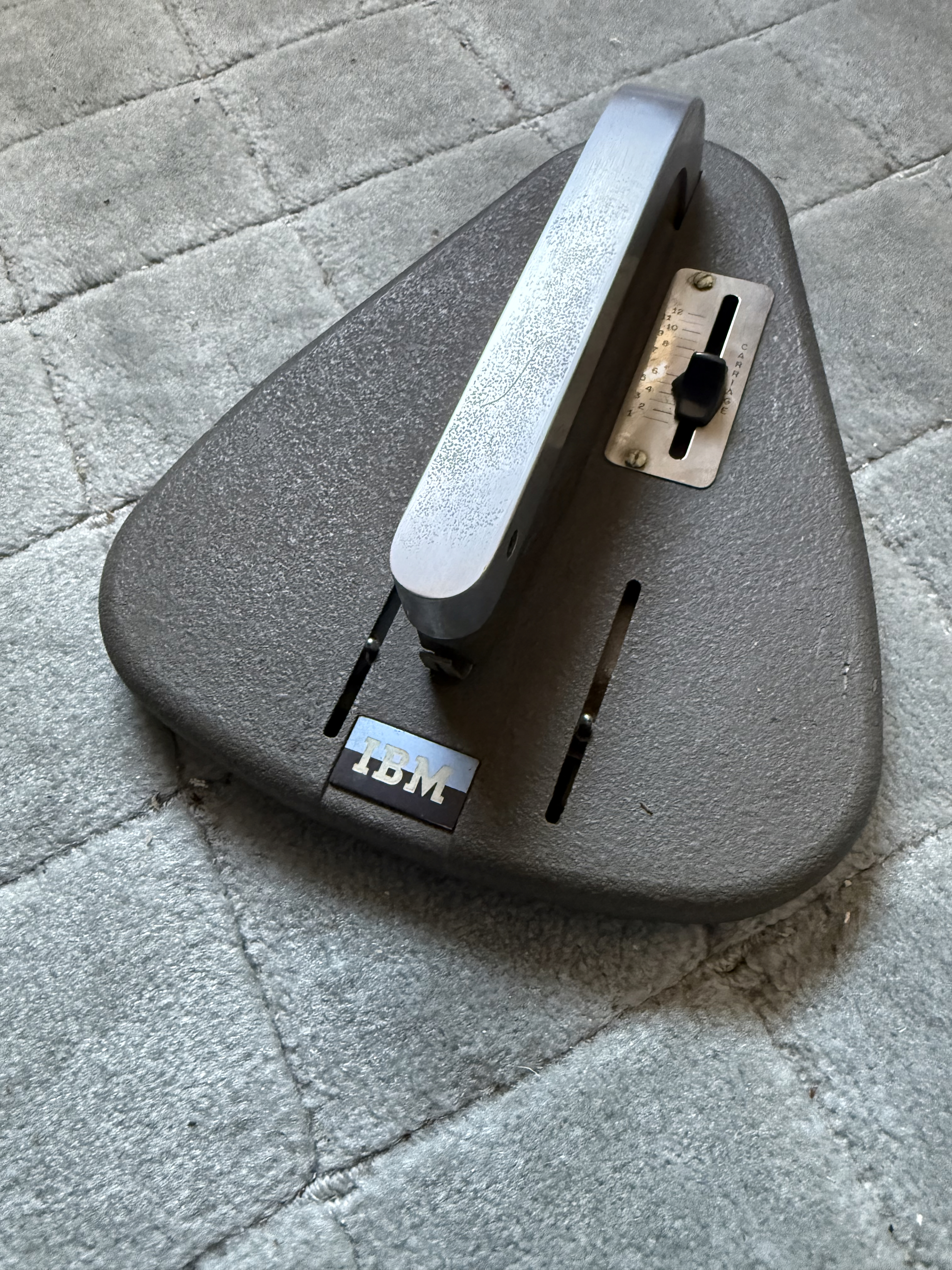
IBM Carriage Control Tape Punch
