= IBM 2821 Control Unit =

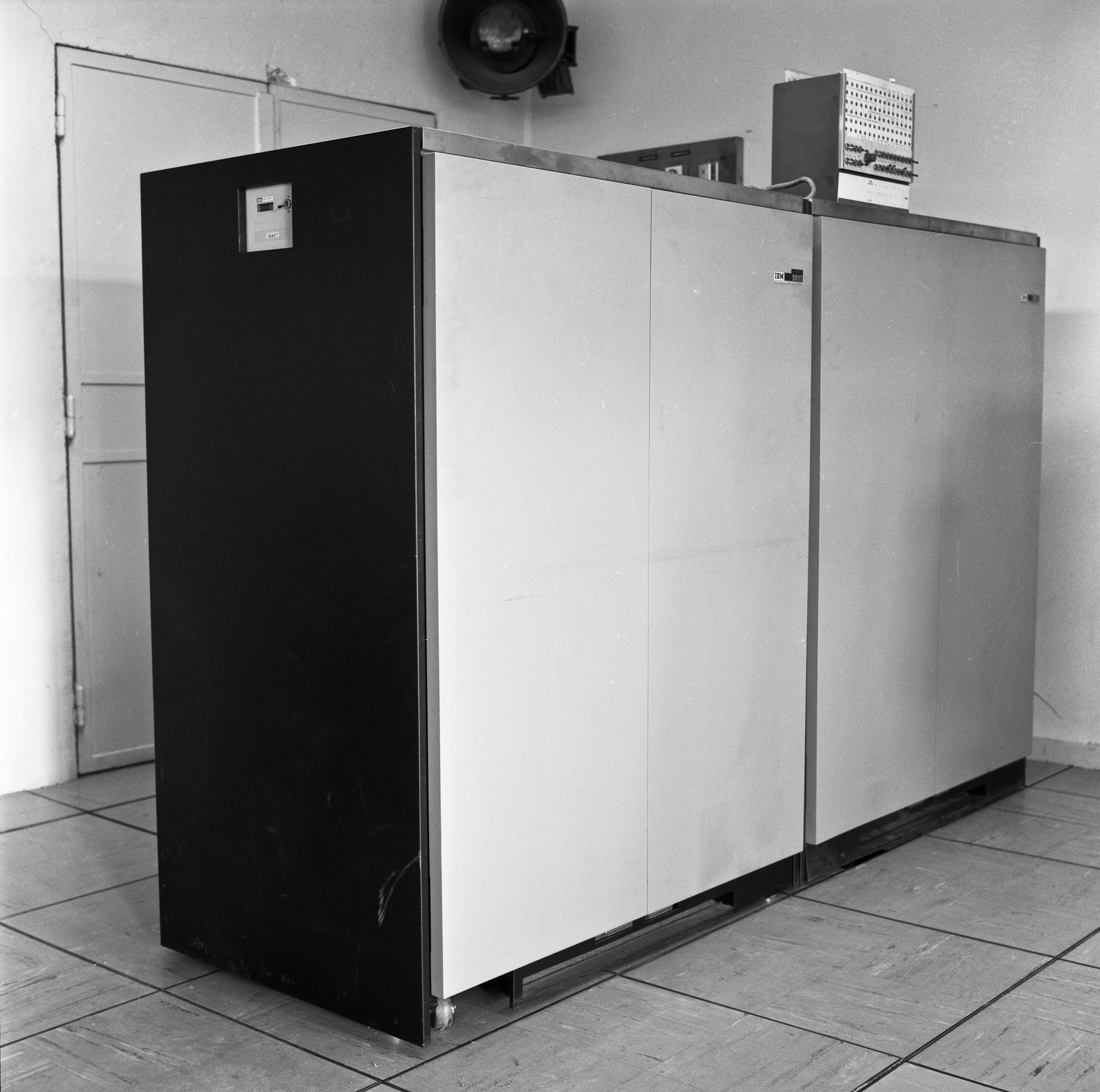

The IBM 2821 Control Unit attaches card readers and card punches, and line printers to the IBM System/360 and IBM System/370 families of computers. The devices attached may be a combination of:

- The IBM 2540 card reader and card punch;
- The IBM 1403 models 2, 3, 7 and N1 line printer; and
- The IBM 1404 model 2 line printer and bill feed printer.

The 2821 was originally advertised—in 1964, before System/360 shipped—as a controller for the IBM 1402 card reader/punch and the IBM 1403 and IBM 2201 printers.

Six models of the IBM 2821 Control Unit were available, as follows:

- Model 1 attaches one IBM 2540 and one IBM 1403;
- Model 2 attaches one IBM 1403;
- Model 3 attaches two or three IBM 1403s;
- Model 4 attaches one IBM 2540 and one IBM 1404, but only on IBM System/360 models 25, 30, 40 and 50;
- Model 5 attaches one IBM 2540 and two or three IBM 1403s; and
- Model 6 attaches one IBM 2540.

The 2821 is fully buffered, that is it has buffers large enough to hold an entire card to punch, an entire card read, or an entire print line for each attached device. This frees the channel from having to meet the peripheral devices' tight timing requirements.

The control unit can be connected to either a byte multiplexer channel or a selector channel. It is made up of logically independent control units, but takes up only one of the eight control unit slots which can be connected to a channel. A two-channel switch is available, allowing the control unit to be connected to two channels, on one or two computer systems, controlled by manual switches or by programming.

The circuitry in the 2821 is largely older-technology IBM SMS, unlike much of the System/360 line, but later revisions were partially implemented in SLT or MST. As logic became cheaper, the functions of the 2821 were increasingly moved inboard to the central processor or outboard to the individual device. The 2821 was withdrawn from marketing in the United States in 1985.
