= Tubular NDT =

Tubular NDT (nondestructive testing) is the application of various technologies to detect anomalies such as corrosion and manufacturing defects in metallic tubes. Tubing can be found in such equipment as boilers and heat exchangers. To carry out an examination in situ (i.e., examination of the tubes in position, where they are installed), a manhole cover is usually removed to allow a technician access to the tubes. Alternatively, a tube bundle may be removed from a heat-exchanger and transported by forklift to a maintenance area for easier access.

The usual means of examination is to insert some type of probe into the tubes, one at a time, while data is recorded for later interpretation. The technologies listed below (ECT, RFT, IRIS, and MFL) are all able to detect defects on the outside of the tube from the inside. The tubes must be clean enough to allow passage of the probe: deposits of debris, rust, or scale may have to be removed by chemicals or pressure washing. In water-tube boilers, the tubes may be examined from the outside when the boiler is shut down, often using ultrasonic testing.

== Common methods ==
- Eddy-current testing (ECT) is commonly used on non-[ferromagnetic] metals and alloys such as copper, brass, and copper nickel. Variations on ECT are partial saturation ECT and magnetic biased ECT, both of which use magnets to allow ECT to operate in lightly ferromagnetic materials or in thin-wall ferromagnetic tubes.
- Remote field testing (RFT) is used on [ferromagnetic] materials such as carbon steel.
- IRIS (Internal rotary inspection system) can be used on all types of metal tubes. IRIS is very slow, but very accurate, and is often used as a back-up to a remote field examination.
- Magnetic flux leakage (MFL) testing is used on carbon steel tubes, although it tends to be less accurate than remote field testing.

== Sources ==
- Heat exchangers: Monitoring and maintenance
- H. Sadek, NDE technologies for the examination of heat exchangers and boiler tubes – principles, advantages and limitations, PDF, 2.1 MB.
- Fathi E. Al-Qadeeb, Tubing Inspection Using Multiple NDT Techniques, PDF, 118 kB.
