= Tubular =

Tubular may refer to:

- having the form of a hollow cylinder, or tube
- having the form of a cylinder
- Tubular, a television-related entertainment blog on the Houston Chronicle website
- Tubular, a level in the video game Super Mario World
- Tubular, surf culture slang for cool or awesome, derived from catching a wave and getting in the tube
- Tubular people, a former ethnic group in Russia

The adjective is often applied to items which are somewhat tubular in shape:

- Tubular bells, musical instruments (also known as chimes) in the percussion family
- Tubular bridge, a bridge built as a rigid box girder section, with the traffic carried within the section
- Tubular chassis or superleggera, a type of automobile construction technique used only in expensive sports cars
- Tubular Gallery, a large diameter, round, tubular steel structure used to enclose a troughed conveyor belt
- Tubular pin tumbler lock, or tubular lock, a type of lock using a tubular key
- Tubular NDT, nondestructive testing applied to metallic tubing
- Tubular neighborhood, a mathematical concept
- Tubular-pneumatic action, a playing action for pipe organs, in which key and stop activity is transmitted from the console to the windchest via pneumatic impulses traveling through tubes
- Tubular tyre, a bicycle tyre (tire) which is glued onto the rim

The adjective is often applied to parts of the body which resemble or are composed of tube-like members:

- Tubular gland
- parts of the kidney:
  - Distal convoluted tubule
  - Uriniferous tubule
  - Tubular fluid, the fluid in the tubules of the kidney
