= Electromagnetic testing =

Electromagnetic testing (ET), as a form of nondestructive testing, is the process of inducing electric currents or magnetic fields or both inside a test object and observing the electromagnetic response. If the test is set up properly, a defect inside the test object creates a measurable response.

The term "electromagnetic testing" is often intended to mean simply eddy-current testing (ECT). However, with an expanding number of electromagnetic and magnetic test methods, "electromagnetic testing" is more often used to mean the whole class of electromagnetic test methods, of which eddy-current testing is just one. also useful for the testing of drill pipes.

== Common methods ==
- Eddy-current testing (ECT) is used to detect near-surface cracks and corrosion in metallic objects such as tubes and aircraft fuselage and structures. ECT is more commonly applied to nonferromagnetic materials, since in ferromagnetic materials the depth of penetration is relatively small.
- Remote field testing (RFT) is used for nondestructive testing (NDT) of steel tubes and pipes.
- Magnetic flux leakage testing (MFL) is also used for nondestructive testing (NDT) of steel tubes and pipes. At present RFT is more commonly used in small diameter tubes and MFL in larger diameter pipes over long travel distances.
- Wire rope testing is MFL applied to steel cables, to detect broken strands of wire.
- Magnetic particle inspection (MT or MPI) is a form of MFL where small magnetic particles in the form of a powder or liquid are sprayed on the magnetized steel test object and gather at surface-breaking cracks.
- Alternating current field measurement (ACFM) is similar to eddy current applied to steel. Its most common application is to detect and size cracks in welds. from the company that developed it.
- Pulsed eddy current enables the detection of large-volume metal loss in steel objects from a considerable stand-off, allowing steel pipes to be tested without removing insulation.

== See also ==
- Electromagnetic compatibility
