= Tube =

Tube or tubes may refer to:

- Tube (2003 film), a 2003 Korean film
- "Tubes" (Peter Dale), performer on the Soccer AM television show
- Tube (band), a Japanese rock band
- Tube & Berger, the alias of dance/electronica producers Arndt Rörig and Marco Vidovic from Germany

== Other media ==
- Tube, a freeware game for MS-DOS computers from Bullfrog Productions
- TUBE., an online magazine about visual and performing arts, founded in 2012 in Sacramento, California
- Series of tubes, an analogy for the Internet used by United States Senator Ted Stevens
- Picture tube, term in Paint Shop Pro software for a small digital image with no background

== Science, technology, and mathematics ==
=== Construction and mechanics ===
- Tube (fluid conveyance), a long hollow cylinder used for moving fluids
- Tube (structure), building designed to act like a hollow cylinder, cantilevered perpendicular to the ground
- Inner tube, a component of vehicular tires
- Pneumatic tube, a method of transportation using compressed air
- Shipping tube (or mailing tube) – container unit.
- Structural tubing, a type of metal profile used in structural applications
- An underground railway constructed in a circular tunnel by the use of a tunnelling shield

=== Electronics ===
- Tube (BBC Micro), an expansion bus on the BBC Micro computer
- Cathode-ray tube, a component used in display devices such as televisions
- Vacuum tube, an electronic component

=== Mathematics ===
- Tube domain, in several complex variables
- Tubular neighborhood, in differential geometry
- Cylinder (geometry), from elementary geometry

=== Other technologies ===
- Tube (container), a type of packaging for pasty and viscous goods such as toothpaste
- Extension tube, a tool for macro photography
- Test tube, a piece of laboratory equipment

=== Other uses in science ===
- Eustachian tube, part of the structure of the ear
- Lava tube, found in volcanic regions
- Fungal tubes, mushroom structure

== Transportation ==
- Hudson Tubes, a colloquial historical name for the PATH (rail system)
- The Tube, a widely used name for the London Underground, a rapid transit train system
- Transbay Tube, an underwater rail tube across San Francisco Bay

== Other uses ==
- Tube (toy), or swim ring, a toy that assists play on water
- Tubes (peak), the second highest peak of the Mecsek mountain range in Hungary
- Tubing (recreation), riding on an inner tube as a recreational activity
- Yoplait Tubes or Go-Gurt, a brand of sweetened yogurt
- A type of surf wave
- Tube, Kakao Friends characters

== See also ==
- Pipe (fluid conveyance), a tubular section or hollow cylinder used to convey substances which can flow
- The Tube (disambiguation)
- Microtube (disambiguation)
- Tub (disambiguation)
- Tubing (disambiguation)
