= RAMAC =

RAMAC may refer to:

- IBM 305 RAMAC, a computing system introduced in 1956
- IBM 350 RAMAC, a disk storage unit introduced in 1956 as a bundled component of the IBM 305 RAMAC
- IBM 650 RAMAC, a computing system consisting of an IBM 650 with an IBM 355 Disk Storage unit and introduced in 1956
- IBM 9394 RAMAC Array, a disk storage array and controller unit introduced in 1994 which uses data striping
