= John Rand =

John Rand may refer to:

- John L. Rand, 1861–1942, American politician and jurist
- John Goffe Rand 1801–1873, portrait painter and inventor
- John Rand (actor) (1871–1940), American actor who notably supported Charles Chaplin
