= Tubing =

Tubing may refer to:

- Tube (fluid conveyance), a long hollow cylinder used for moving fluids or to protect cables and wires
- Pipe (fluid conveyance), a tubular section used to convey substances that can flow
- Piping, a system of pipes used to convey fluids
- Plumbing, any system that conveys fluids for a wide range of applications
- Hose, a flexible hollow tube designed to carry fluids
- Structural tubing, a component of a hollow structural section
- Brass instrument tubing
- Tubing (recreation), the act of riding an inner tube

== See also ==
- Tube (disambiguation)
- Tub (disambiguation)
