= Chub (container) =

Food packaging material

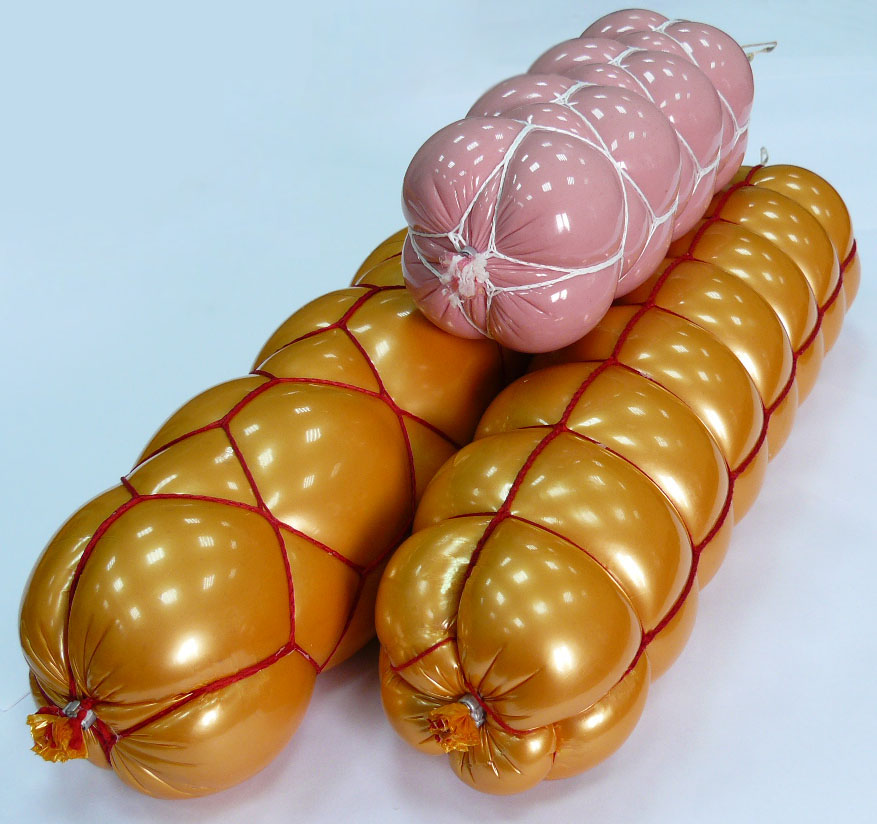
One type of chub used for bulk sausage

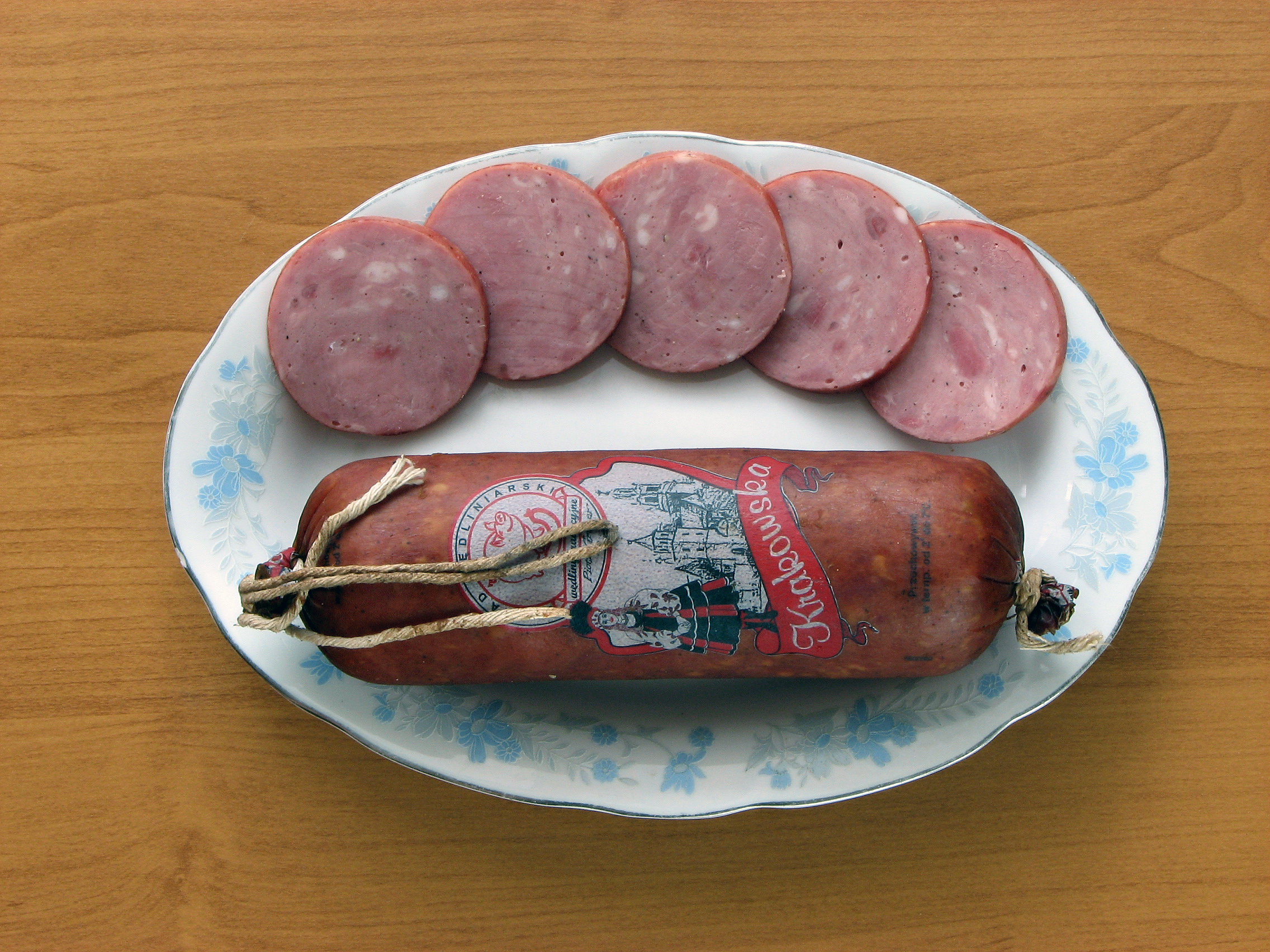
Kielbasa

A chub or a chub pack is a type of container formed by a tube of flexible packaging material. The cylindrical package has the appearance of a sausage with the ends sealed by metal crimps or clips.

== Uses ==
Chub packs are used to pack semi-solid materials such as:

- sausage
- ground beef and ground turkey
- dog food
- cheese spreads
- frostings
- bread dough
- cookie dough
- creamed corn
- drywall compound
- explosive slurries

== See also ==
- Tube (container)
