= The Tube (disambiguation) =

The Tube is a name for the London Underground, a rapid transit system serving Greater London and environs.

The Tube may also refer to:

- Television
- The Tube (1982 TV series), a 1982–1987 British music programme on Channel 4
- The Tube (2003 TV series), an ITV/Sky programme featuring the work of staff on the London Underground
- The Tube (2012 TV series), a BBC documentary about those who work and travel on the London Underground
- The Tube Music Network, a 2005–2007 American music video channel
- Cardiff Bay Visitor Centre (The Tube), a demolished building in Wales, UK
- PATH (rail system), a railroad linking New Jersey and New York, US
- KTBU, formerly branded as "The Tube", a television station licensed to Conroe, Texas, US
- "The Tube", a 1996 song by Tiësto

== See also ==
- The Tubes, an American rock band
- Tube (disambiguation)
