= Tub =

Tub may refer to:

- A tub (container):
  - a round or oblong container with or without a lid:
    - a plant pot
  - a shallow, plastic or paper container, typically with a lid or closure
  - Tub (unit), a former quantity for sale or butter or cheese
- A bathtub, a plumbing fixture for bathing
- Hot tub, a large bath or small pool designed to comfortably hold multiple persons
- Quarry tub, a type of railway or tramway wagon
- Slack tub, in blacksmithing, a quench
- Tub boat, an unpowered cargo boat used on early canals
- Twin tub, a type of washing machine
- Tub file, in computing, an early, primitive random access memory technology.
- Tub Welch, a baseball player.

TUB may refer to:

- TUB (gene)
- Citroën TUB, a light van
- Technische Universität Berlin (Germany)
- Transports Urbains du Beauvaisis, local public transport operator in northern France
- Tubuai – Mataura Airport (IATA airport code)

TUBS or Tubs may refer to:

- Time unit box system, a system for notating events that happen over a time period.
- Tokai University Boarding School in Denmark
- Ryan Tubridy, Irish television and radio presenter.

== See also ==
- Tubb
- Tubbs
- Tube (disambiguation)
