= Sweep frequency eddy current testing =

Sweep frequency eddy current testing (SFECT) is a type of eddy current testing technique, where the probes are operated around its resonance frequency. Sweep frequency eddy current techniques involve collecting eddy current data at a wide range of frequencies. This usually involves the use of a specialized piece of equipment such as an impedance analyzer or a high precision LCR meter, which can be configured to automatically make measurements over a range of frequencies.

The advantage of a swept frequency measurement is that depth information can be obtained since eddy current depth of penetration varies as a function of frequency.

== Technique ==
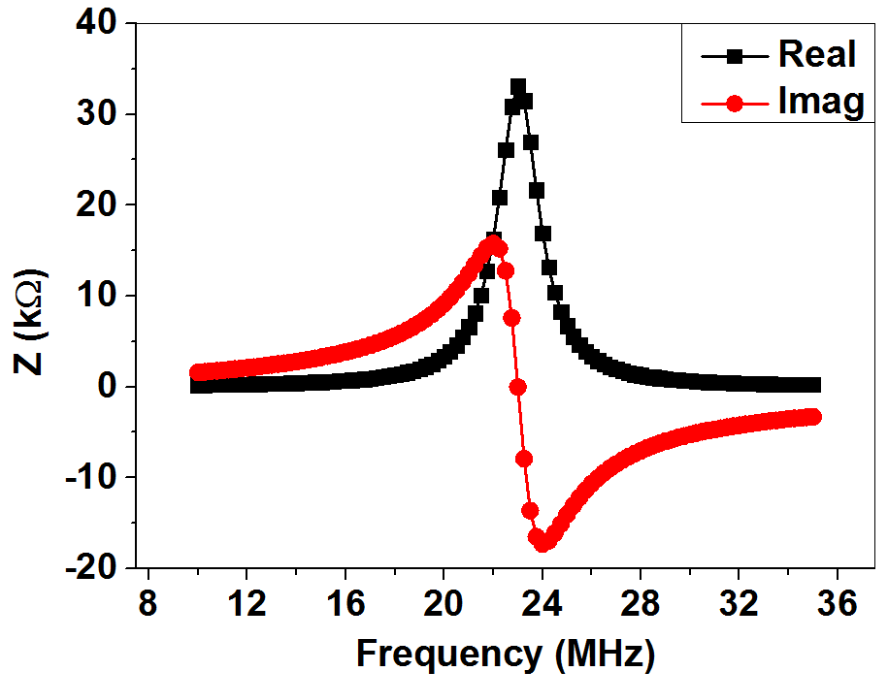
Electrical impedance of a coil under resonance

The simplest eddy current probe is an air cored multi-turn coil operated in absolute configuration. The eddy current coil can be approximated as a parallel circuit, with an ideal inductor and a finite resistance in one branch and a finite capacitance in the other. As the probe is excited over a wide range of frequencies, the copper coil inside the probe undergoes resonance.

This frequency of resonance is termed as peak frequency (PF), as the real part of impedance, $Re(Z)$ reaches a maximum value. This peak frequency is sensitive towards electrical conductivity and magnetic permeability changes in the surrounding medium. Thus, shifts in PF can be correlated with changes in material property, such as defects, inclusions, thickness etc.

Since the coil under resonance is approximated as a parallel LCR circuit, the resonant frequency is approximately proportional to $L^{-1}$, where $L$ is the inductance of the coil. When the coil is placed near an electrically conducting material, eddy currents are generated on the material. The secondary field generated by these eddy currents reduces the total flux contained by the coil and in turn reduces its inductance.

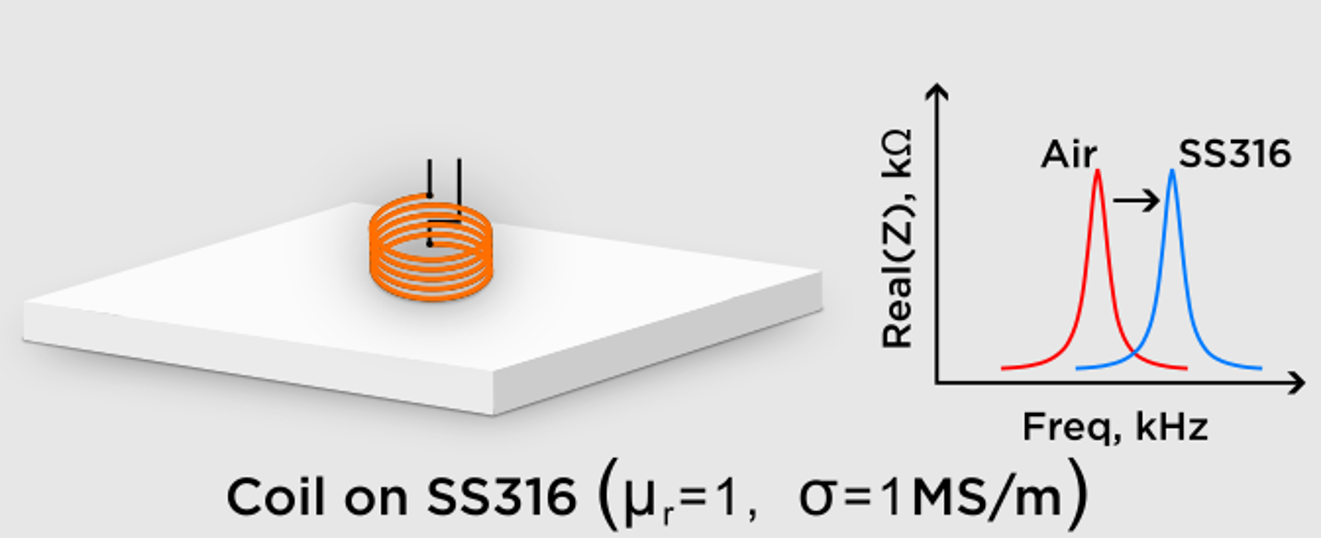
Shift in PF of an SFEC probe when placed on an electrically conducting non-magnetic material.

This causes the resonant frequency to increase and shift towards the right. This shift increases when samples with higher conductivity are used and reaches a saturation. The PF is also sensitive towards changes in magnetic permeability, where an increase in $\mu_r$ leads to an increase in inductance of the coil and subsequently, a decrease in PF.

The technique is highly sensitive towards changes in capacitance, as well. Hence stray capacitance from wires and terminal capacitance of instruments should be eliminated for best performance.

== Applications ==
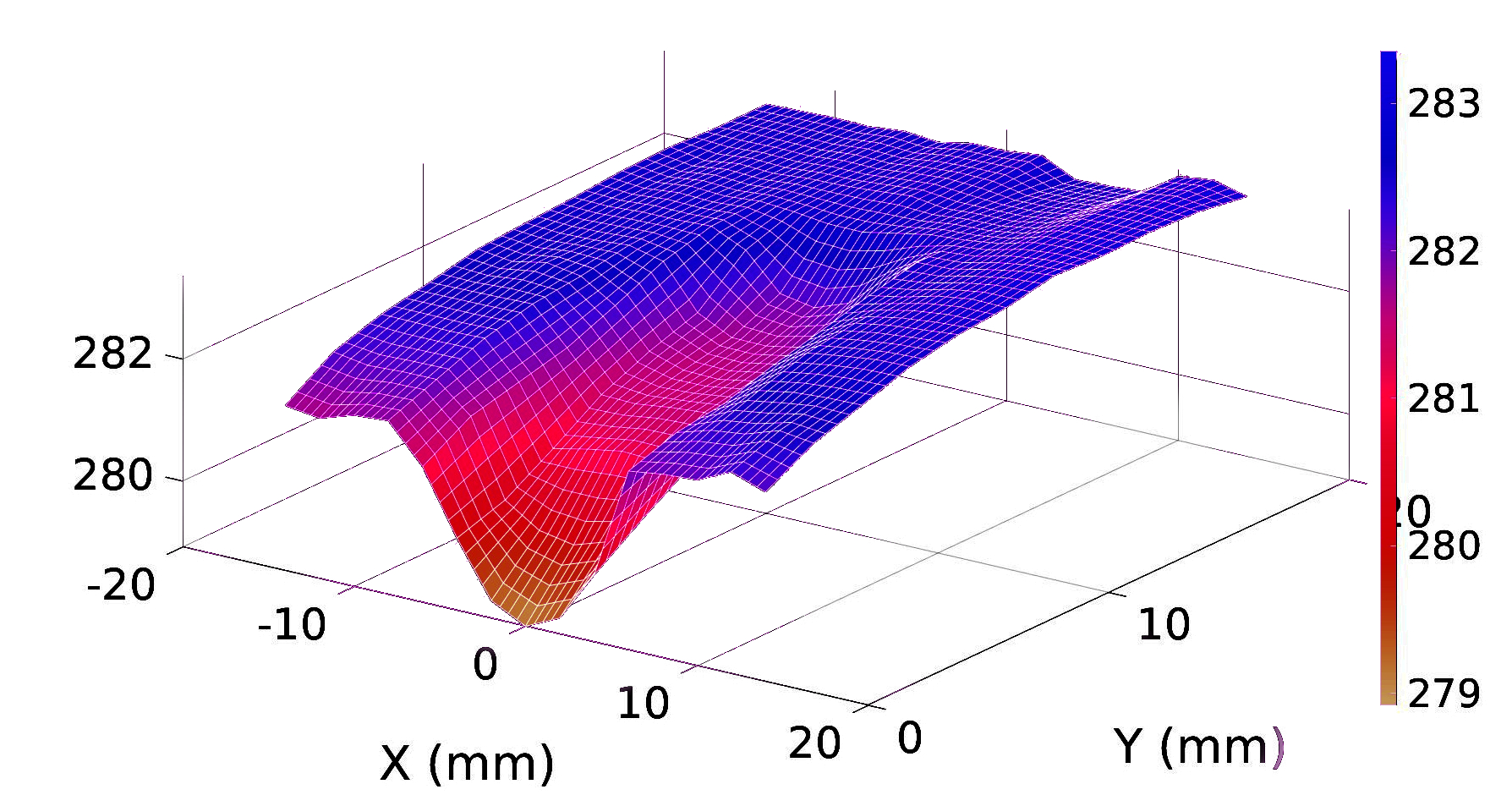
Peak Frequency map of a defect perpendicular to the edge of a metallic plate.

SFECT has found various industry-relevant applications, such as

- estimating aging characterization
- hardness sorting
- coating-thickness estimation
- ferrite content estimation
- defect detection
