= Tube (container) =

Soft, squeezable container

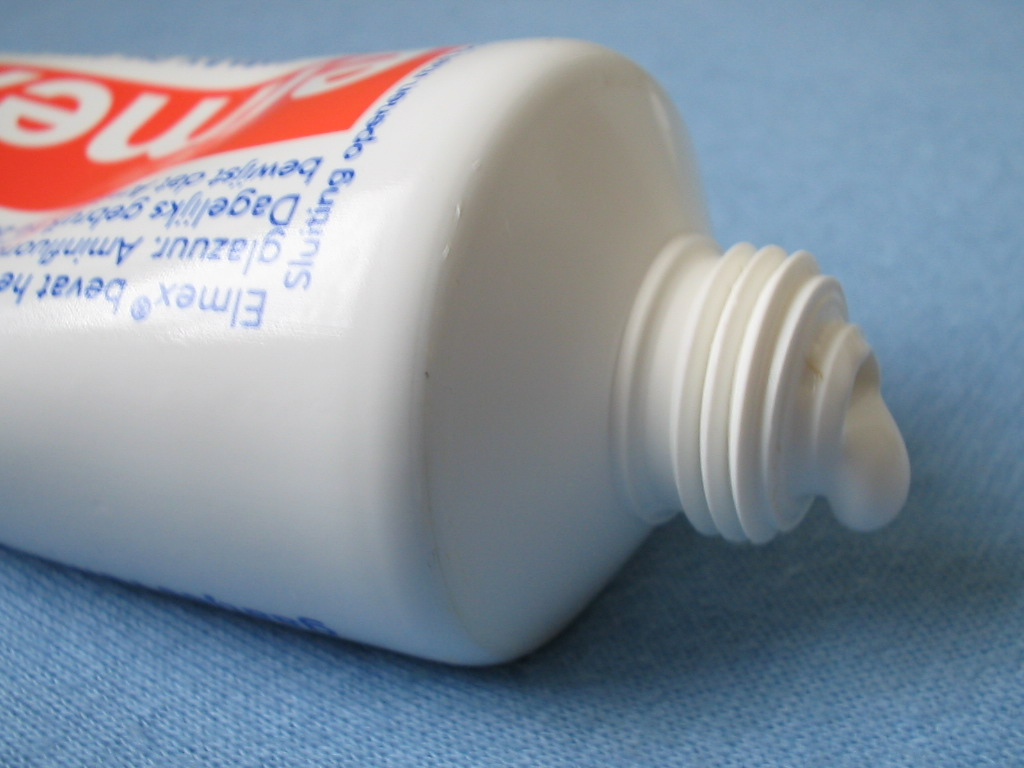
Toothpaste in tube

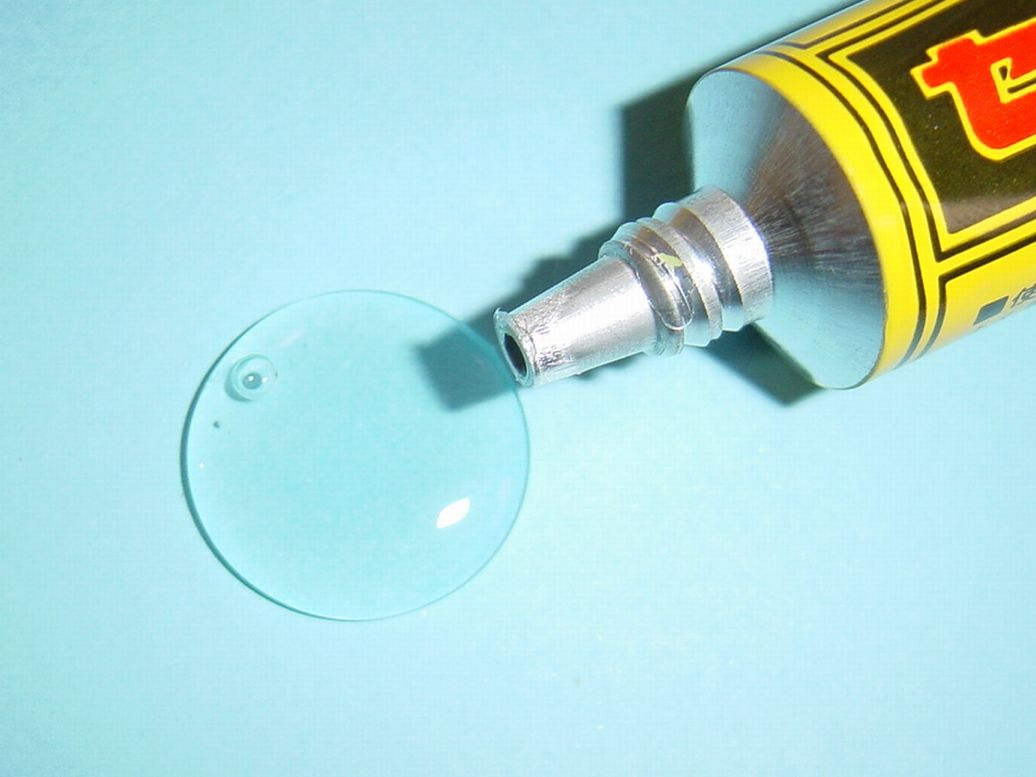
Tube of glue

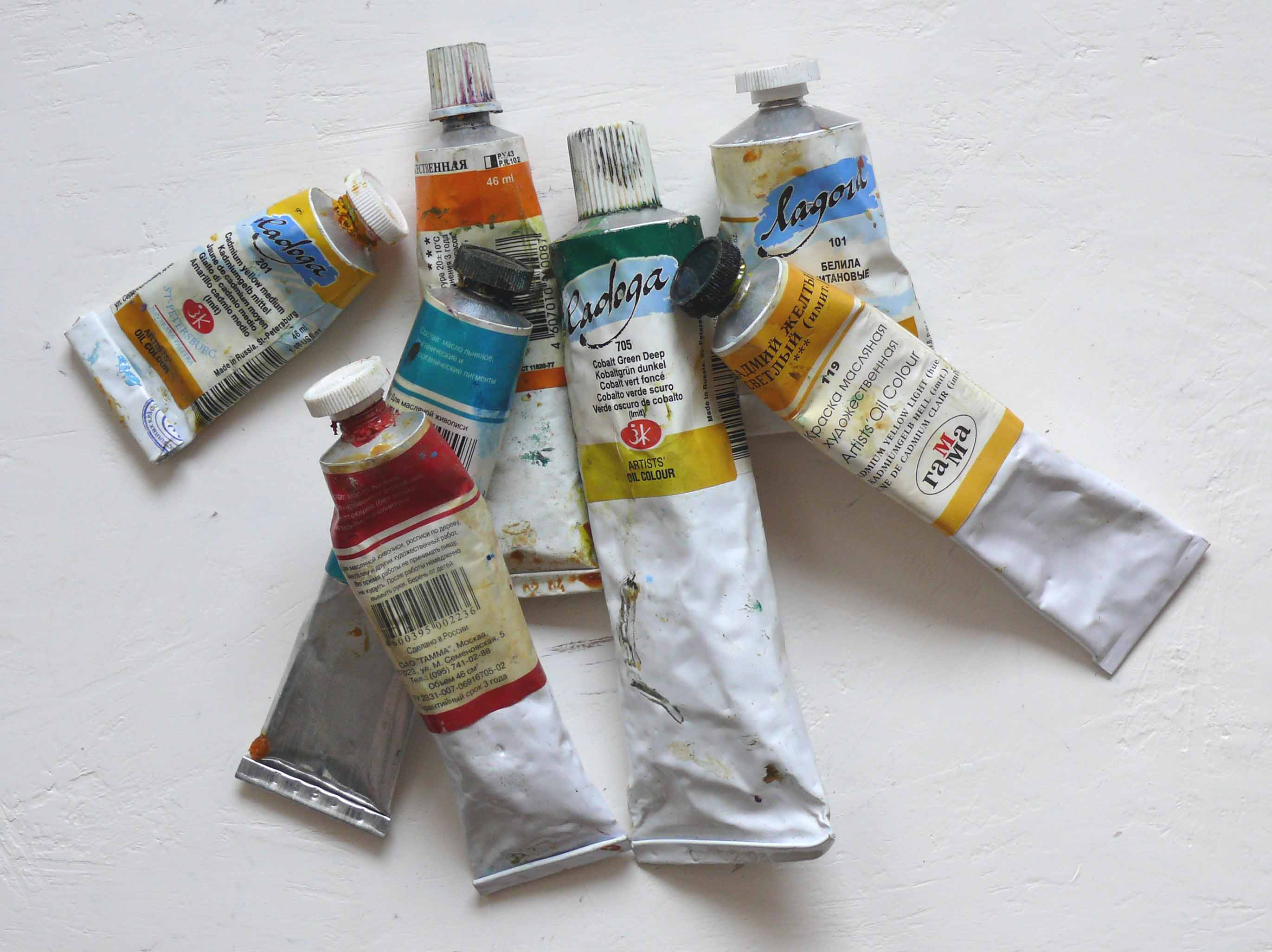
Tubes of oil paint

A tube, squeeze tube, or collapsible tube is a collapsible package which can be used for viscous liquids such as toothpaste, artist's paint, adhesive, caulk, & ointments. Basically, a tube is a cylindrical, hollow piece with a round or oval profile, made of plastic, paperboard, aluminium, or other metal. In general, on one end of the tube body there is a round orifice, which can be closed by different caps and closures. The orifice can be shaped in many different ways: plastic nozzles in various styles and lengths are most typical. The other end is sealed either by welding or by folding.

Typical tube sizes range from 3 ml (0.11 imp fl oz; 0.10 US fl oz) to 300 ml (11 imp fl oz; 10 US fl oz). Most tubes are designed to be dispensed with hand pressure, but some are used with a tube key at the base to help roll them up.

== History ==
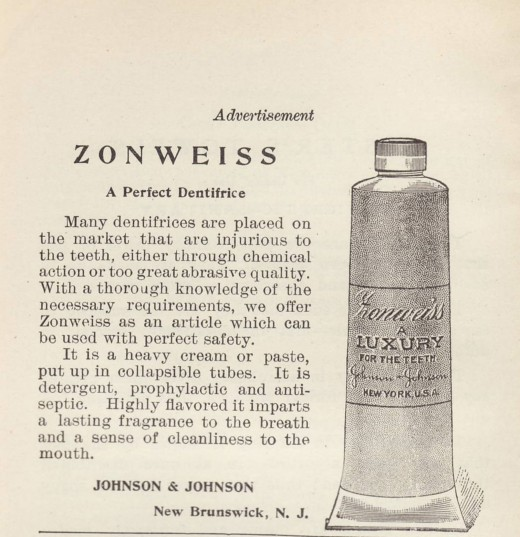
1889 advertisement for Zonweiss dentifrice in a collapsible tube

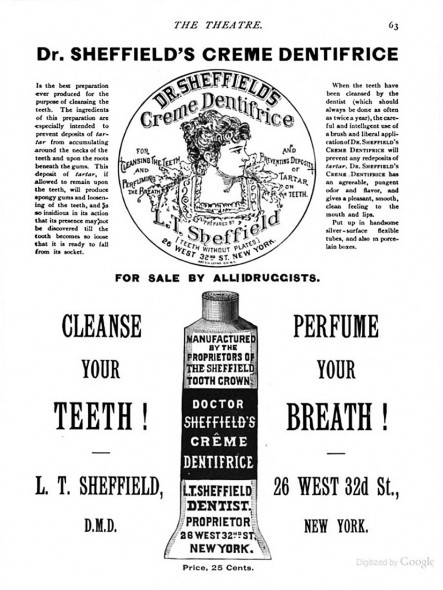
1890s advertisement for "Dr. Sheffield's Creme Dentifrice", an early toothpaste sold in a tube

John Goffe Rand, an American portrait painter, invented the squeezable metal tube in 1841 for paint.

Toothpaste in a tube was introduced by Johnson & Johnson in 1889. Not much later, a New London dentist, Washington Sheffield, started selling toothpaste in lead tubes in the 1890s.

== Materials ==
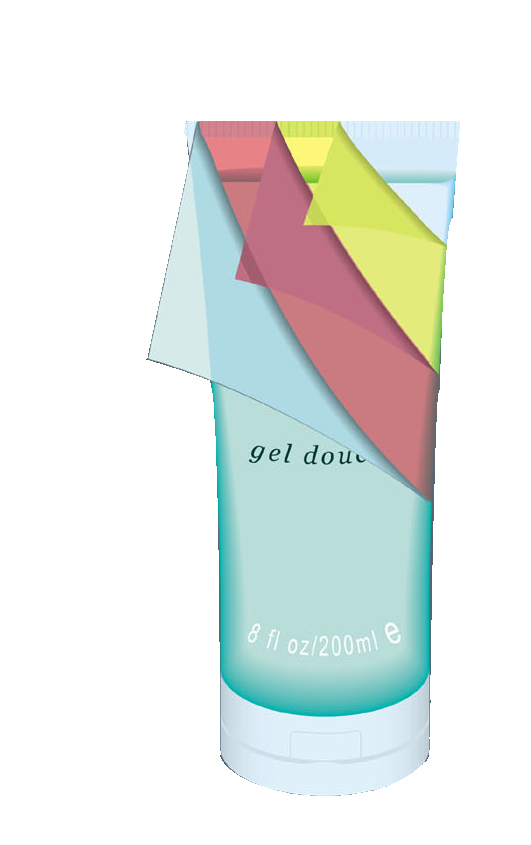
A multi-layer plastic tube

The earliest collapsible tubes were made of tin, zinc, or lead, sometimes coated with wax on the inside.

Aluminium tube caps and closures are generally threaded, as is the nozzle. Aluminium tubes generally have the far end folded several times after the contents have been added. The tube is typically hermetically sealed and nearly germ-free due to the high temperatures during the production process. The inside of the tube can be coated to prevent the material from reacting with the contents. Aluminium tubes are produced by impact extrusion from a small round blank. Designs can be printed onto the tube, using the wet-in-wet offset printing method. Six tones are often used. The filled content can be squeezed out by finger pressure. The main characteristic of aluminium tubes is the total separation of the contents from the surrounding atmosphere; therefore, such tubes are especially suitable for the packaging of highly perishable contents. Aluminium tubes are used for cosmetics, pharmaceuticals, food, paint, and technical products.

Tubes can also be produced in plastic, most commonly polyethylene. Plastic tubes are used for cosmetics such as hand creams, and also some foodstuffs. The plastic tube retains its shape after each squeeze unlike laminate tubes such as toothpaste tubes. Plastic tubes can be highly decorated or have a special additive such as soft touch to make the tube more appealing during use or at the point of sale. Plastic tubes are produced by extrusion. A sleeve is first produced on a specialised extrusion machine. It must be produced to a very high standard (for decoration purposes) and also to tight tolerances, compatible with automated processes after extrusion. Once the sleeve is produced, the tube head is fitted using an automated heading machine. Tube printing using specialised printing machines such as silk screen printing applies the desired decoration. The open tubes are typically filled and sealed at a separate facility. Multi-layer plastic tubes have become increasingly popular; they isolate the contents better from the air, allowing them to be used for a wider range of products, such as food.

== Applications ==
Many commodities are commonly sold in collapsible tubes:

- Toothpaste, formerly metal, now of plastic
- Viscous artists' paint, including oil paint, acrylic paint, and concentrated watercolor paints (which must be diluted with water); typically metal
- Pastes used in food, such as anchovy paste, tomato paste, mustard, mayonnaise and Scandinavian smörgåskaviar
- Pharmaceutical ointments
- Adhesives, caulk, and sealants (larger quantities may use rigid caulk cartridges)
- Other cosmetics and gels

== See also ==
- Chub (container)
- Shipping tube
