= John G. Rand =

American painter

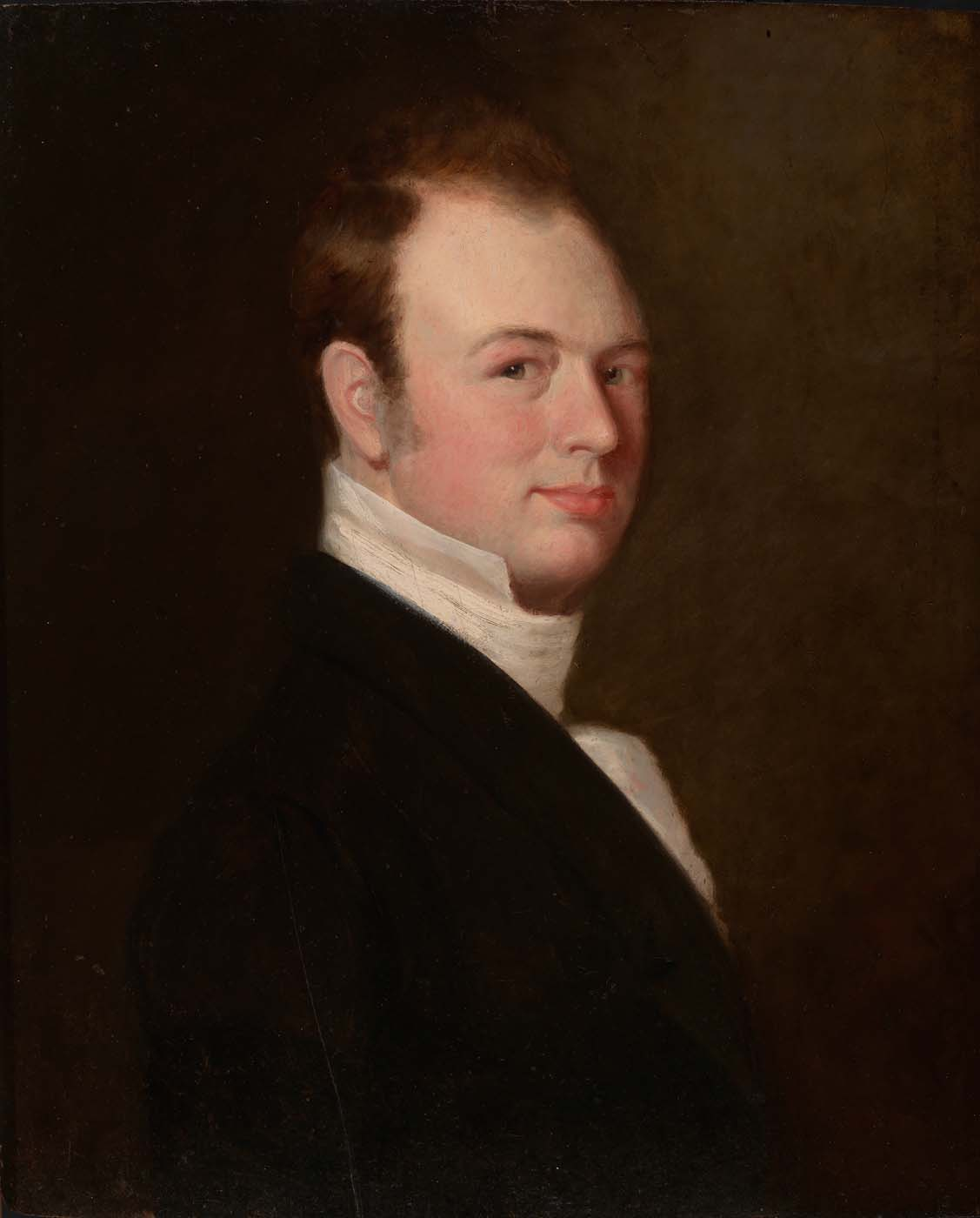
- Self portrait, oil on board, c. 1836
- Born: John Goffe Rand; 27 January 1801; Bedford, New Hampshire
- Died: 23 January 1873 (aged 71); Roslyn, New York
- Known for: Portrait painting
- Spouse: Lavinia Brainerd Rand (m. 1831)

John Goffe Rand (27 January 1801–23 January 1873) was an American painter and inventor. He lived and worked in Boston, London, and New York. Rand invented and patented the first collapsible artist's paint tube.

The tin tube allowed unused oil paint to be stored and used later without drying out. In 1841, Rand patented the invention with the United States Patent Office (Sept 11, 1841 Patent No. 2,252). He went on to patent several later improvements.

Jean Renoir, son of the Impressionist painter Pierre-Auguste Renoir, states that his father once said “Without paints in tubes, there would have been no Cézanne, no Monet, no Sisley or Pissaro, nothing of what the journalists were later to call Impressionism.” Art historian Anthea Callen has argued, however, that Impressionism "cannot be attributed simply to the ready portability" of paint.

Other later inventions by Rand were not as widely received, and most of his ideas were not financially successful.

He was interred at Woodlawn Cemetery in the Bronx, New York.
