= Ground turkey =

Dark and light turkey meat processed with fat

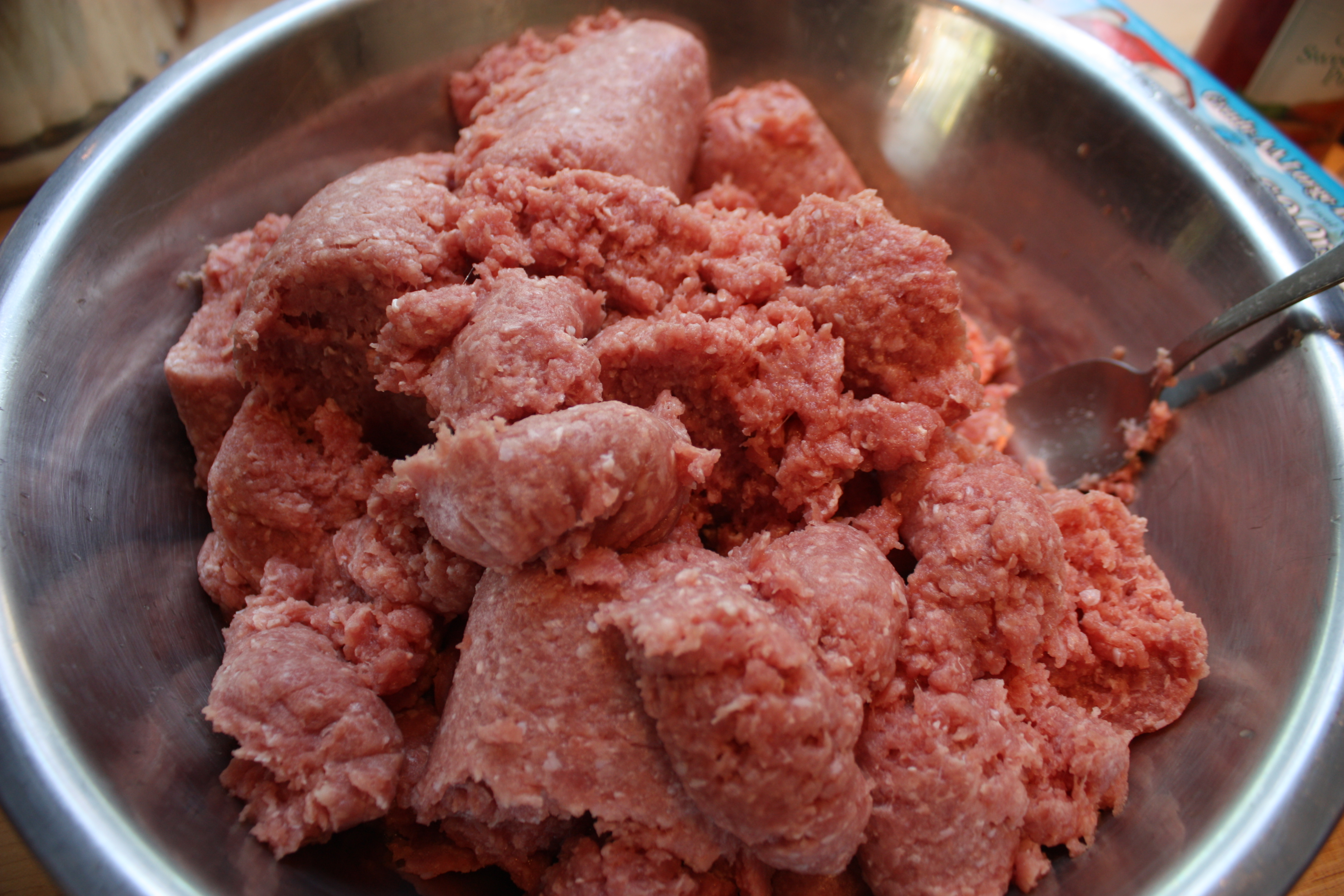
Ground turkey

Ground turkey, also known as turkey mince or minced turkey, is a mixture of dark and light turkey meat with remaining skin and visible fat processed together and minced until a "ground" form emerges. The turkey meat, skin, and fat is taken off the bone and processed with additives. The final product has specific characteristics that appeal to customers, including a non pink color and non crumbly texture. The composition of ground turkey is driven by market demand, availability, and meat prices. The majority of ground turkey is made from excess thighs and drumsticks rather than the more costly breast meat. Ground turkey is a common low-fat alternative for ground beef.

== Regulations ==
According to the US National Turkey Federation (NTF), anything under the label ground turkey is "manufactured from whole muscle material such as drumstick, thighs, neck, etc., with all components, e.g. skin and adhering fat, in natural proportions." Ground turkey producers are not permitted to exceed these limits.

The United States Department of Agriculture (USDA) does not regulate the amount of fat contained in ground turkey. However, fat content must stay at or below natural levels, which are typically between 10% and 15%.

== Labeling ==
The USDA does not require retailers to put a nutrition label on ground turkey products. It is suggested to provide a nutrition label anyway, for the benefit of customers. There are two sets of circumstances under which some labeling is mandatory. First, the packaging must inform of any skin contained in the product. Second, the Nutrition Labeling and Education Act of 1990 states that if the product is labeled "lean" or "extra lean," it needs a nutrition label for evidence.

== Nutrition ==
The Journal of Agriculture and Food Chemistry published a study on random ground turkey samples taken from eight different states and a variety of retailers in the United States. Analyzing moisture, lipid, and cholesterol content, scientists found the means per 100 g of raw product. There is 72 g of moisture, 8.5 g of lipids, and 81 mg of cholesterol. Also analyzing the different turkey parts – dark meat, light meat, skin, and visible fat – they found lipid and cholesterol contents to vary based on the ratios of those parts in the product.

=== Fatty acids ===
The composition of fatty acids found in the ground turkey samples include cis-octadecenoates, linoleate, palmitate, stearate, cis-hexadecenoates, and trans-octadecenoates. Scientists found trans fatty acids in every sample due to the diets of turkeys. Ground turkey and ground beef have similar percentages of fatty acid content.

Fatty acid contents in ground turkey
Fatty acid categories	Proportion
Saturated fatty acids	30.4%
Monounsaturated fatty acids	41.7%
Polyunsaturated fatty acids	27.0%

=== Visible fat ===
The average overall fat content per 100 g of ground turkey is 8.5 grams compared to 5.9 grams of total fat found in extra lean ground beef.

=== Cholesterol ===
In retail raw ground turkey samples, the mean cholesterol content is 81 mg per 100 g; similar to the mean of 78 mg per 100 g of raw ground beef product.

== Food safety ==
According to the American Meat Institute (AMI), USDA inspectors oversee turkey plant operations and ensure that federal food safety rules are obeyed. The AMI Vice President James H. Hodges said that the turkey industry's preventative approach, including "a series of food safety hurdles" is key in reducing instances of harmful bacteria in turkey products. Regulations emphasize keeping facilities and equipment sanitary at all times.

=== Safe handling ===
- Check expiration dates and follow the safe handling instructions printed on every package
- Separate from non-packaged foods like produce
- Wash hands with warm water and soap for 20 seconds before and after handling the product
- Cook to 74 °C (165 °F)
- Wash all cooking supplies that contact the ground turkey
- If there is a product recall, return it or dispose of it
- Refrigerate leftovers right away

Safe Storage Times
Type	Refrigerator (40°F/+4°C or below)	Freezer (0°F/ –18°C or below)
Uncooked Ground Poultry	1 to 2 days	3 to 4 months
Cooked Ground Poultry	3 to 4 days	2 to 3 months

== Salmonella ==
Strains of salmonella have been found in ground turkey products. The Division of Animal and Food Microbiology Office of Research did a study on salmonella isolates in four retail ground meats- turkey, chicken, beef, and pork. The ground meats (including 50 samples of turkey) were collected from three retail markets in the Washington D.C. area and were processed and packaged at one of five plants. In the study, they isolated and characterized salmonella strains. They also found the isolates’ antibiotic resistant phenotypes. One salmonella isolate, s. enterica serotype, was found to be more prevalent in ground turkey than other ground meats. 7 out of 10 (70%) of the ground turkey samples contained the isolate.

On July 29, 2011, the Food Safety and Inspection Service (FSIS) issued a public health alert, informing the public that ground turkey products may be the cause of illness associated with a strain of salmonella named Salmonella Heidelberg.

On August 3, 2011, Cargill Meat Solutions Inc. recalled 36 million pounds of ground turkey due to the possibility of salmonella contamination. The FSIS issued a Class 1 recall under FSIS-RC-060-2011. The USDA classifies a Class 1 Recall as a hazardous health situation where the chance of the product causing serious consequences or death is high. The recalled products have the establishment number "P-963" and were produced between February 20 and August 2, 2011.

On September 11, 2011, the FSIS and Cargill Meat Solutions issued a Class 1 recall under FSIS-RC-071-2011. 185,000 pounds of ground turkey products were recalled based on the possibility of the products being contaminated with Salmonella Heidelberg (Xbal PFGE pattern 58/Blnl pattern 76), a strain that is resistant to ampicillin, gentamicin, streptomycin, and tetracycline. The recalled products were produced Aug. 23, 24, 30, and 31 of 2011, and are marked with the establishment number "P-963."

=== Factors ===
A study from Ankara University used a conventional culture technique to isolate salmonella to determine the seasonal effects on incidence rates in ground turkey. In spring, summer, and autumn, salmonella rates are highest (48%, 55%, and 63% respectively). During the winter season the frequency of salmonella significantly lowers to 16%. Due to the complexity of food processing, salmonella found in processed turkey does not necessarily stem from the product itself. Before customers get the product, it goes through a series of phases including "flock, slaughterhouse, processing, distribution centers and retail marketing. The conditions of each of these environments influence whether or not the ground turkey becomes contaminated.

=== Antibiotic resistance ===
Certain strains of salmonella in ground turkey resist antibiotics. Ankara University's study found salmonella in ground turkey resisted 25% of nalidixic acid, 17% of streptomycin, and 15% of tetracycline. Overall, approximately one out of ten of the samples had salmonella strains that were resistant to four or more antibiotics.
