= Microtube =

Microtube may refer to:

- Microtube (electronics)
- Microtube (microtechnology)
