= Eddy-current testing =

Electromagnetic method of non-destructive testing of conductive materials

Eddy-current testing (also commonly seen as eddy current testing and ECT) is one of many electromagnetic testing methods used in nondestructive testing (NDT) making use of electromagnetic induction to detect and characterize surface and sub-surface flaws in conductive materials.

== History ==
Eddy current testing (ECT) as a technique for testing finds its roots in electromagnetism. Eddy currents were first observed by François Arago in 1824, but French physicist Léon Foucault is credited with discovering them in 1855. ECT began largely as a result of the English scientist Michael Faraday's discovery of electromagnetic induction in 1831. Faraday discovered that when there is a closed path through which current can circulate and a time-varying magnetic field passes through a conductor (or vice versa), an electric current flows through this conductor.

In 1879, another English-born scientist, David Edward Hughes, demonstrated how the properties of a coil change when placed in contact with metals of different conductivity and permeability, which was applied to metallurgical sorting tests.

Much of the development of ECT as a nondestructive testing technique for industrial applications was carried out during World War II in Germany. Professor Friedrich Förster while working for the Kaiser-Wilhelm Institute (later the Kaiser Wilhelm Society) adapted eddy current technology to industrial use, developing instruments measuring conductivity and sorting mixed ferrous components. After the war, in 1948, Förster founded a company, now called the Foerster Group where he made great strides in developing practical ECT instruments and marketing them.

Eddy current testing is now a widely used and well understood inspection technique for flaw detection, as well as thickness and conductivity measurements.

Frost & Sullivan analysis in the global NDT equipment market in 2012 estimated the magnetic and electromagnetic NDT equipment market at $220 million, which includes conventional eddy current, magnetic particle inspection, eddy current array, and remote-field testing. This market is projected to grow at 7.5% compounded annual growth rate to approximately $315 million by 2016.

== ECT principle ==
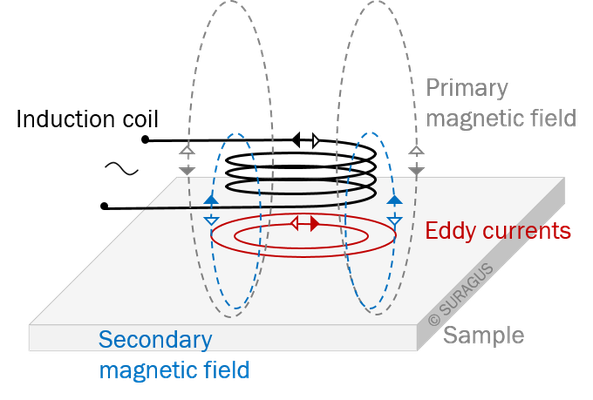
Visualization of Eddy Currents Induction

In its most basic form — the single-element ECT probe — a coil of conductive wire is excited with an alternating electric current. This wire coil produces an alternating magnetic field around itself. The magnetic field oscillates at the same frequency as the current running through the coil. When the coil approaches a conductive material, currents opposite to the ones in the coil are induced in the material — eddy currents.

Variations in the electrical conductivity and magnetic permeability of the test object, and the presence of defects causes a change in eddy current and a corresponding change in phase and amplitude that can be detected by measuring the impedance changes in the coil, which is a telltale sign of the presence of defects. This is the basis of standard (pancake coil) ECT. NDT kits can be used in the eddy current testing process.

ECT has a very wide range of applications. Since ECT is electrical in nature, it is limited to conductive material. There are also physical limits to generating eddy currents and depth of penetration (skin depth). Displayed phase lag of 2 radians (115°) occurs every skin depth, supporting accurate flaw depth and thickness measurements.

== Flaw size estimation ==
Relating flaw signals to the sizes and range of aspect ratios needed for rejection threshold and damage tolerance risk assessment is a core challenge for NDE engineers. A regression model for linear flaw sizing has been developed to provide improved accuracy when applied to data from ECT arrays. This model demonstrates superior adjusted R² fit and significantly lower prediction errors compared to standard linear and polynomial regression approaches, particularly when sizing far-surface semi-elliptical fatigue cracks and artificial notches.

The Nichols-Wincheski calibration model takes the following logarithmic form:

ln(S) = B_{1} · ln(A) + B_{2} · a

where:

- S = signal voltage response
- A = flaw area
- a = far-sided flaw depth
- B_{1}, B_{2} = regression coefficients

Excel implementation:

1. Columns: ln(S), ln(A), a
2. B_{1}, B_{2} = LINEST(ln(S), ln(A):a, FALSE)
3. S = A^{B_{1}} · e^{B_{2}·a}

The functional form aligns with established eddy current physics principles, and with it, flaw depth is estimated at an assumed aspect ratio critical for damage tolerance assessment. The power law term (A^{B_{1}}) reflects the nonlinear relationship between flaw scattering volume and induced eddy current disruption, while the exponential term (e^{B_{2}·a}) accounts for signal attenuation due to skin depth effects as flaws become more distant from the inspection surface.

Flaw area:

For semi-elliptical surface flaws, the flaw area A is determined by the flaw depth a and the aspect ratio a/c, where c is half the crack surface length. This allows distinguishing between easier-to-detect longer flaws with an aspect ratio of 0.2 and more challenging semi-circular flaws with an aspect ratio of 1.0, expressed as:

$$A = \frac{\pi a^2}{2(a/c)}$$

This formulation enables systematic evaluation of model performance across different flaw geometries commonly encountered in inspections. However, regression analyses must always be constrained to the range of bounding flaw aspect ratios and depths represented in the experimental dataset.

== Applications ==
The two major applications of eddy current testing are surface inspection and tubing inspections. Surface inspection is used extensively in the aerospace industry, but also in the petrochemical industry. The technique is very sensitive and can detect tight cracks. Surface and volumetric inspection can be performed both on ferromagnetic and non-ferromagnetic materials. Optimized ECT array inspections, with skin depth tuned near material thickness and calibrated on 100-micron wide half-sized component notches, have revealed backside flaw depths at ~60% thickness.

Tubing inspection is generally limited to non-ferromagnetic tubing and is known as conventional eddy current testing. Conventional ECT is used for inspecting steam generator tubing in nuclear plants and heat exchangers tubing in power and petrochemical industries. The technique is very sensitive to detect and size pits. Wall loss or corrosion can be detected but sizing is not accurate.

A variation of conventional ECT for partially magnetic materials is full saturation ECT. In this technique, permeability variations are suppressed by applying a magnetic field. The saturation probes contain conventional eddy current coils and magnets. This inspection is used on partially ferromagnetic materials such as nickel alloys, duplex alloys, and thin-ferromagnetic materials such as ferritic chromium molybdenum stainless steel. The application of a saturation eddy current technique depends on the permeability of the material, tube thickness, and diameter.

A method used for carbon steel tubing is remote field eddy current testing. This method is sensitive to general wall loss and not sensitive to small pits and cracks.

=== ECT on surfaces ===
When it comes to surface applications, the performance of any given inspection technique depends greatly on the specific conditions — mostly the types of materials and defects, but also surface conditions, etc. However, in most situations, the following are true:

- Effective on coatings/paint: yes
- Computerized record keeping: partial
- 3D/Advanced imaging: none
- User dependence: high
- Speed: low
- Post-inspection analysis: none
- Requires chemicals/consumables: no

=== Other applications ===
ECT is also useful in making electrical conductivity and coating thickness measurements, among others.

== Other eddy current testing techniques ==
To circumvent some of the shortcomings of conventional ECT, other eddy current testing techniques were developed with various successes.

=== Eddy current array ===
Eddy current array (ECA) and conventional ECT share the same basic working principles. ECA technology provides the ability to electronically drive an array of coils ( multiple coils) arranged in specific pattern called a topology that generates a sensitivity profile suited to the target defects. Data acquisition is achieved by multiplexing the coils in a special pattern to avoid mutual inductance between the individual coils. The benefits of ECA are:

- Faster inspections
- Wider coverage
- Less operator dependence — array probes yield more consistent results compared to manual raster scans
- Better detection capabilities
- Easier analysis because of simpler scan patterns
- Improved positioning and sizing because of encoded data
- Array probes can easily be designed to be flexible or shaped to specifications, making hard-to-reach areas easier to inspect

ECA technology provides a powerful tool and saves time during inspections. ECA inspection in carbon steel welds is regulated by ASTM standard E3052.

=== Lorentz force eddy current testing ===
A different, albeit physically closely related challenge is the detection of deeply lying flaws and inhomogeneities in electrically conducting solid materials.

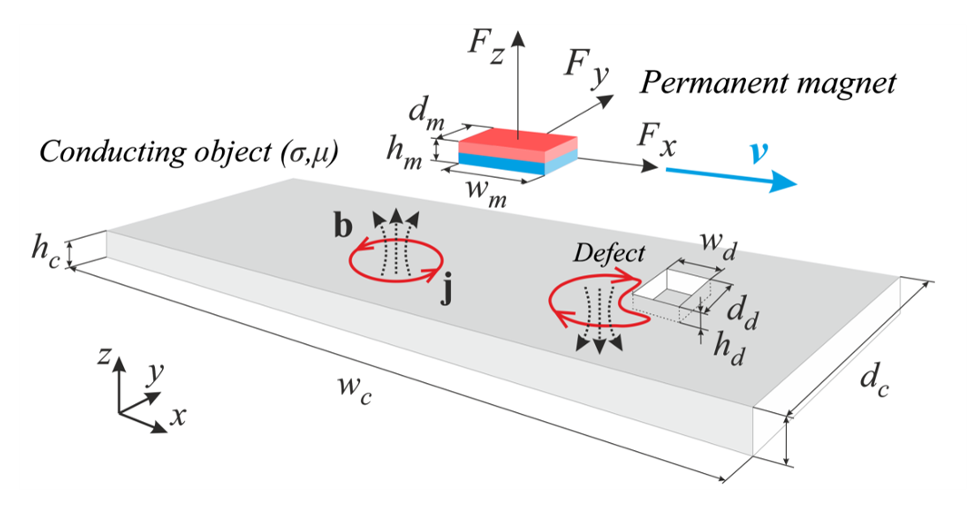
Fig. 1 : LET working principle. Adapted from

In the traditional version of eddy current testing an alternating (AC) magnetic field is used to induce eddy currents inside the material to be investigated. If the material contains a crack or flaw which make the spatial distribution of the electrical conductivity nonuniform, the path of the eddy currents is perturbed and the impedance of the coil which generates the AC magnetic field is modified. By measuring the impedance of this coil, a crack can hence be detected. Since the eddy currents are generated by an AC magnetic field, their penetration into the subsurface region of the material is limited by the flux density (or strength of the magnetic field) generated by the probe. The applicability of the traditional version of eddy current testing is therefore limited to the analysis of the immediate vicinity of the surface of a material, usually of the order of one millimeter. Attempts to overcome this fundamental limitation using low frequency coils and superconducting magnetic field sensors have not led to widespread applications.

A recent technique, referred to as Lorentz force eddy current testing (LET), exploits the advantages of applying DC magnetic fields and relative motion providing deep and relatively fast testing of electrically conducting materials. In principle, LET represents a modification of the traditional eddy current testing from which it differs in two aspects, namely (i) how eddy currents are induced and (ii) how their perturbation is detected. In LET eddy currents are generated by providing the relative motion between the conductor under test and a permanent magnet(see figure). If the magnet is passing by a defect, the Lorentz force acting on it shows a distortion whose detection is the key for the LET working principle. If the object is free of defects, the resulting Lorentz force remains constant.

== See also ==
- Eddy current
- Nondestructive testing
- Alternating current field measurement
- Cover Meter
- Metal detector
- Skin effect
- Sweep Frequency Eddy Current testing (SFECT)
