= Alternating current field measurement =

Alternating current field measurement (ACFM) is an electromagnetic technique for non-destructive testing detection and sizing of surface breaking discontinuities. It was derived from the methods used in eddy-current testing and works on all metals, ferrous or non-ferrous. Since it doesn't require direct electrical contact with the surface it can work through thin coatings such as paint. This practice is intended for use on welds in any metallic material.

== Use ==
The system was originally developed in the early 1990 for the sub-sea and topside inspections of offshore structures without the need to remove the item's protective coating. Since then it has been successfully applied to onshore process plants and has gained use for inspections of offshore assets. Applications include in-service inspection of welded items and crack detection in vessels. Its main purpose is to evaluate welds in the area of the toe for surface breaking discontinuities such as fatigue cracks.

== Method ==
The ACFM probe induces a uniform alternating current in the area under test and detects magnetic field of the resulting current near the surface.

This current is undisturbed if the area is defect free. A crack redirects the current around the ends and faces of the crack. The ACFM instrument measures these disturbances in the field and uses mathematical modelling to estimate crack size. The lateral and vertical components of the magnetic field are analyzed; disturbances indicate a crack is present, and the size and depth of the crack can be calculated.

== Capabilities ==
The method both detects cracks and estimates their size and length. It can inspect any electrically conductive material. Data is recorded electronically for off-line evaluation if necessary and provides a permanent record of indications. Tests can be repeated and compared over time for ongoing monitoring.

The method is non-invasive and can carry out inspection without removing any protective paint coating. With suitable probes, the method can be used on hot surfaces.

New technologies have now allowed ACFM to be carried out on subsea assets with the assistance of ROV's

== Limitations ==
- Not recommended for short sections or small items.
- Locations of weld repairs and localised grinding can cause spurious indications.
- Multiple defects reduce the ability to estimate defect depth.
- May be more difficult to interpret signals
- Can not determine the direction of propagation of defect into the parent metal

The probability of detection and false detection rate is generally good, but it is application dependent.

The alternating current field measurement method (ACFM) does not have available performance demonstration initiative results. Based upon hundreds of performance demonstration initiatives for MT, ET, and alternating current field measurement; probability of detection for ACFM is given below.

In refereed (PDI'S) based on fit-for-purpose in-service; the Oil and Gas and Drilling Contractors use 6 mm length and .5 mm depth and non-visual for width. Using MT based on API RP 2X, ET BSI 1711 and ACFM ASTM-A36 MT the probability of detection for MT and ET were 90% while ACFM was 76%.

== Preparation ==
Non-adherent protection such as insulation must be removed. The system can operate through non-conductive adherent coatings, but there may be a need to remove heavy or loose scale and spatter.
