= Internal rotary inspection system =

Ultrasonic method of the nondestructive testing of pipes and tubes

Internal rotary inspection system (IRIS) is an ultrasonic method for the nondestructive testing of pipes and tubes. The IRIS probe is inserted into a tube that is flooded with water, and the probe is pulled out slowly as the data is displayed and recorded. The ultrasonic beam allows detection of metal loss from the inside and outside of the tube wall.

== Principle of operation ==
The IRIS probe consists of a rotating mirror that directs the ultrasonic beam into the tube wall. The mirror is driven by a small turbine that is rotated by the pressure of water being pumped in. As the probe is pulled the spinning motion of the mirror results in a helical scan path.

One of the key settings in the procedure is to ensure that the ultrasonic pulse initiates in the very focus point at the center of the tube or pipe. An off-center pulse will show a distorted image of the tube due to the difference in the sound path for either side of the tube wall. For that reason there are centering devices that help the operator to keep the turbine centered at all times.

The transducer utilized for the inspection has to be high frequency, high enough to bounce back at both the inner wall and the outer wall. The frequency range typically used for the piezoelectric transducer is from 10 to 25 MHz.

== Features ==
- Field-proven and commonly used in boilers, heat exchangers, and fin-fan tubes.
- Often used as a back-up to electromagnetic examination of tubes, to verify calibration and accuracy. Especially useful as a follow-up to remote field testing due to the full sensitivity near tube support structures provided by IRIS.
- The IRIS probe must be moved very slowly (approximately 1 inch per second, or 2.5 cm/s), but it produces very accurate results (wall thickness measurements typically accurate to within 0.005 inch, or 0.13 mm).
- Before the examination, tubes must be cleaned on the inside to bare metal.
- A supply of clean water is needed, typically at a pressure of 60 psi, or 0.4 MPa. Dirt or debris in the water may cause the turbine to jam.
- Works for tube diameters of 1/2 inch (13 mm) and up. Special centralizing devices are needed for larger diameters.
- Works in metal or plastic tubes.
- Through-holes are difficult to detect by using this method.
- Operates at temperatures above freezing.
- Can pass bends, but will not detect defects in bends.
- Not sensitive to cracks aligned with tube radius.

== Sources ==
- Tubing Inspection using Multiple NDT Techniques. By Fathi E. Al-Qadeeb. PDF, 118 kB.
- Condition Monitoring - Process Plant Tube Inspection: an Ongoing Commitment by Plant Owners and Operators. By Charles Panos.
- NDT and Heat Exchanger Tubes. By Helle H. Rasmussen, Hans Kristensen & Leif Jeppesen.
