= Shipping tube =

Long and narrow cardboard shipping container

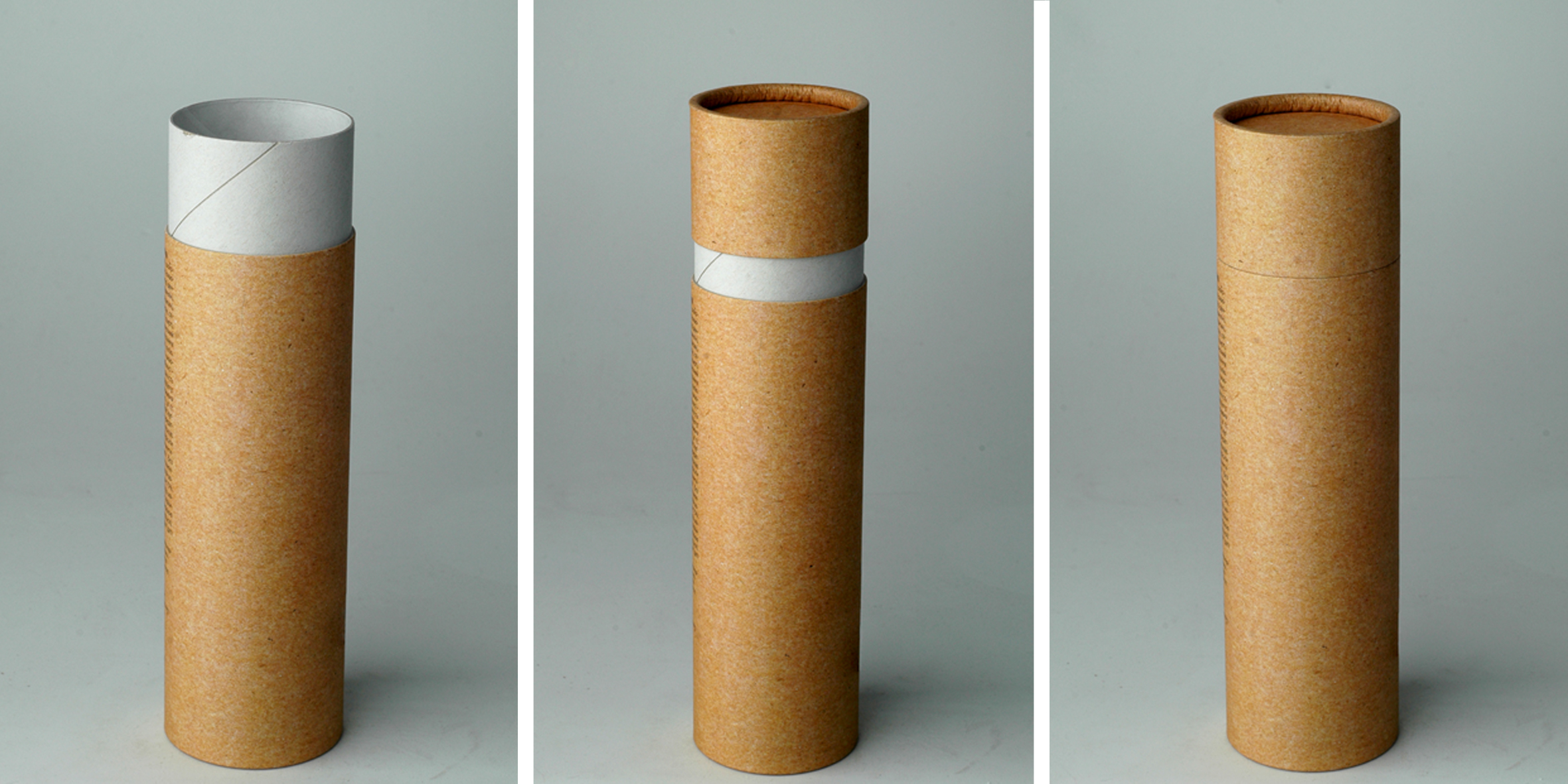
Mailing tube with telescoping end.

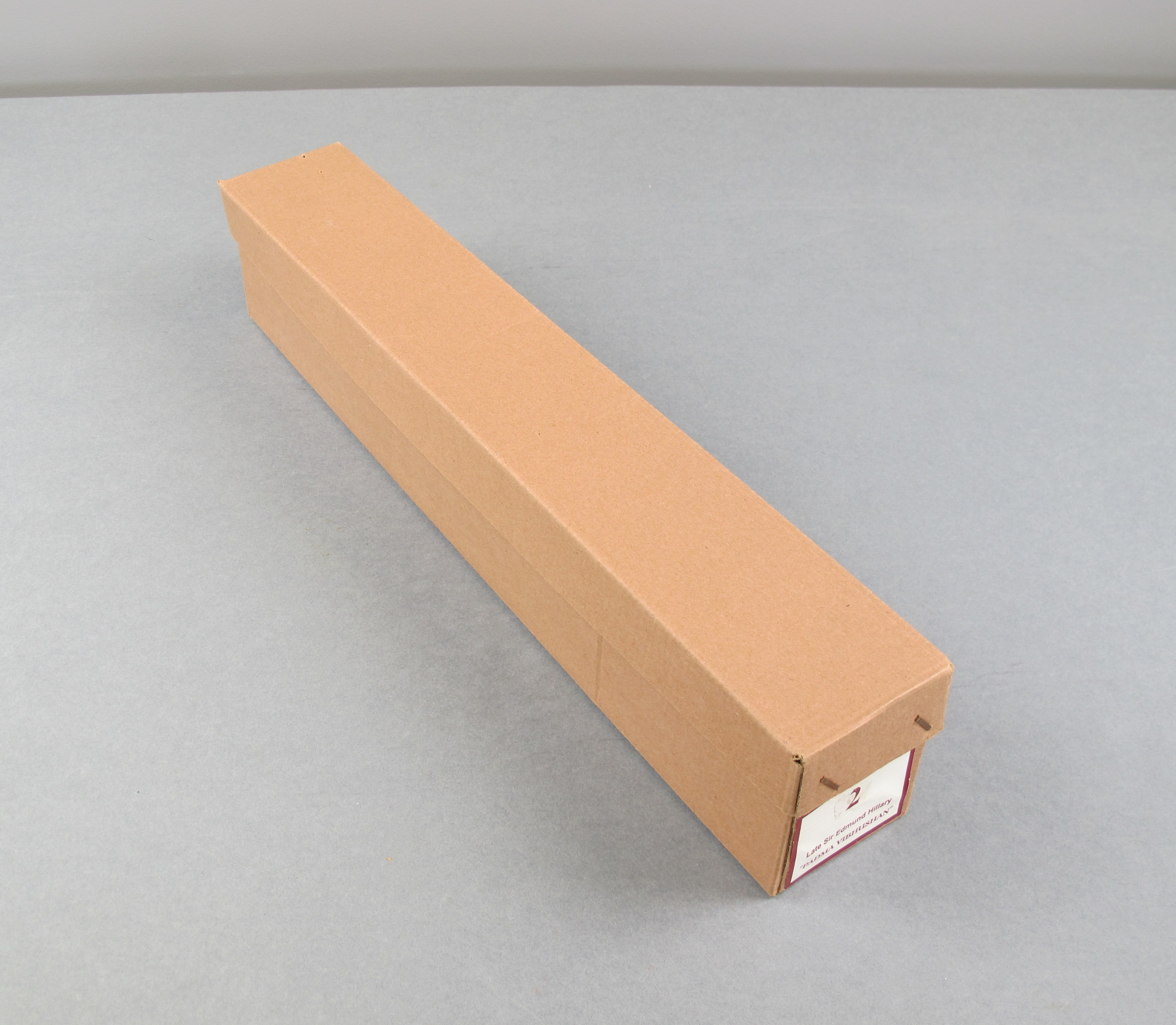
Long corrugated box, square cross section

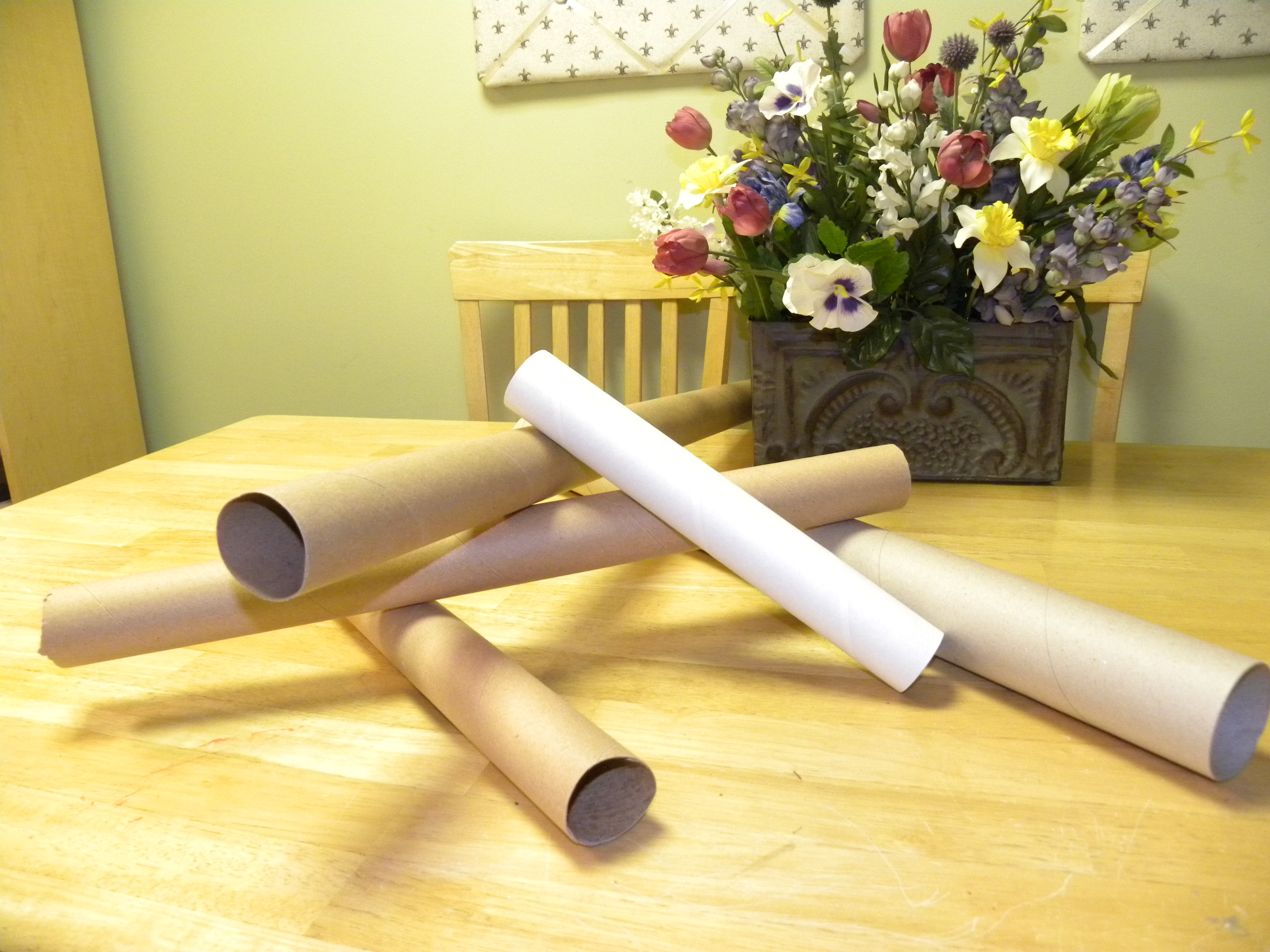
Paperboard tubes

A shipping tube, mailing tube, or cardboard tube is a shipping container used to ship long items. It is usually a long package with a narrow cross-section: square, triangle, or round.

== History ==
Composite paper tubes started being used for shipping at the beginning of the 20th century. A machine for making convolute composite cans, where sheets of straw paper or board are wound perpendicular to the tube, was introduced in 1886 by the W. C. Richie Company. In 1904 the Monroe Binder Board Company introduced the first large cylindrical juteboard shipping containers for packaging cheese, and convolute drums wound from kraft paper saw widespread use in WWII. Several methods for making spiral-wound composite cans, which could be made from continuous strips of paper, were introduced between 1900 and 1910, and provided a quicker and cheaper method of manufacturing small tubes.

== Light duty ==
Rolls of paper, rolled artwork, curtain rods, posters, etc are often shipped in tubes. Many tubes are made of layers of paperboard of appropriate strength, and are referred to as composite cans. The open ends may have plastic caps or plugs. Pressure sensitive tape can seal tubes; some paper tubes have two sections which slide to telescope closed.

Corrugated fiberboard is also used for shipping tubes. Five panel folders and similar designs are common. Triangular folders are also used.

== Heavy duty ==
Longer and heavier tubes are usually made of stronger grades of corrugated board, sometimes double wall. Five panel folders can be used for heavier duty applications. Some long boxes have separate recessed pieces of corrugated stapled inside the ends. Wood ends are also used when needed.
