= Remote field testing =

Remote field testing (RFT) is a method of nondestructive testing using low-frequency AC. whose main application is finding defects in steel pipes and tubes. RFT is also referred to as remote field eddy current testing (RFEC or RFET). RFET is sometimes expanded as remote field electromagnetic technique, although a magnetic, rather than electromagnetic field is used. An RFT probe is moved down the inside of a pipe and is able to detect inside and outside defects with approximately equal sensitivity (although it can not discriminate between the two). Although RFT works in nonferromagnetic materials such as copper and brass, its sister technology eddy-current testing is preferred.

The basic RFT probe consists of an exciter coil (also known as a transmit or send coil) which sends a signal to the detector (or receive coil). The exciter coil is pumped with an AC current and emits a magnetic field. The field travels outwards from the exciter coil, through the pipe wall, and along the pipe. The detector is placed inside the pipe two to three pipe diameters away from the exciter and detects the magnetic field that has travelled back in from the outside of the pipe wall (for a total of two through-wall transits). In areas of metal loss, the field arrives at the detector with a faster travel time (greater phase) and greater signal strength (amplitude) due to the reduced path through the steel. Hence the dominant mechanism of RFT is through-transmission.

== Main features ==
- commonly applied to examination of boilers, heat exchangers, cast iron pipes, and pipelines.
- no need for direct contact with the pipe wall
- probe travel speed around 30 cm/s (1 foot per second), usually slower in pipes greater than 3 inch diameter.
- less sensitive to probe wobble than conventional eddy current testing (its sister technology for nonferromagnetic materials)
- because the field travels on the outside of the pipe, RFT shows reduced accuracy and sensitivity at conductive and magnetic objects on or near the outside of the pipe, such as attachments or tube support plates.
- two coils generally create two signals from one small defect

The main differences between RFT and conventional eddy-current testing (ECT) is in the coil-to-coil spacing. The RFT probe has widely spaced coils to pick up the through-transmission field. The typical ECT probe has coils or coil sets that create a field and measure the response within a small area, close to the object being tested.

== See also ==
- Internal rotary inspection system

== References and sources ==
- ASTM E 2096 – 00 Standard Practice for In Situ Examination of Ferromagnetic Heat-Exchanger Tubes Using Remote Field Testing
- Outline of RFT

Specific
