= Tub file =

Data storage system using punched cards

The tub file was a technique used in the punched card era to speed generation of data files. Multiple copies of frequently used cards were prepunched and stored in trays with index tabs between card sets, arranged so that cards would be easy to find.

This technique was an early form of random access memory.

== Example ==
A wholesaler might have a tub file with cards for frequent customers and for each inventory item. Instead of keypunching a set of cards for each purchase order, a clerk would pull out one customer card and then a card for each item that customer ordered. The resulting deck could then be run through a tabulating machine to produce an invoice.

In this example item cards also provided inventory control, since each card presumably represented one item in stock, so it was simple to check availability and schedule reordering.
