= 132nd =

132nd is the ordinal form of the number 132. 132nd or One hundred and thirty-second may also refer to:

- A fraction, 1/132, equal to one of 132 equal parts

== Geography ==
- 132nd meridian east, a line of longitude
- 132nd meridian west, a line of longitude

== Military ==
- 132nd Brigade (disambiguation)
- 132nd Division (disambiguation)
- 132nd Regiment (disambiguation)
- 132nd Wing
- 132nd Operations Group
- 132d Aero Squadron
- 132nd Air Refueling Squadron
- 132nd Squadron (Turkey)
- 132nd Air Assault Reconnaissance Battalion (Ukraine)
- 132nd Engineer Battalion
- 132nd Engineer Battalion "Livenza"
- 132nd Battalion (North Shore), CEF
- 132nd Aviation Company
- 132nd (Irish Horse) Company, Imperial Yeomanry

== See also ==
- May 12, 132nd day of the year in a standard year
