= 132nd Brigade =

132nd Brigade may refer to:

- 132nd Motorized Infantry Brigade, People's Republic of China
- 132nd Armored Brigade "Ariete", Italy
- 132nd Armored Brigade "Manin", Italy
- 132nd Independent Mixed Brigade, Imperial Japanese Army
- 132nd Separate Guards Motor Rifle Brigade, Russia
- 132nd Infantry Brigade (United Kingdom)

== See also ==
- 132nd Division (disambiguation)
- 132nd Regiment (disambiguation)
