= 132nd Operations Group =

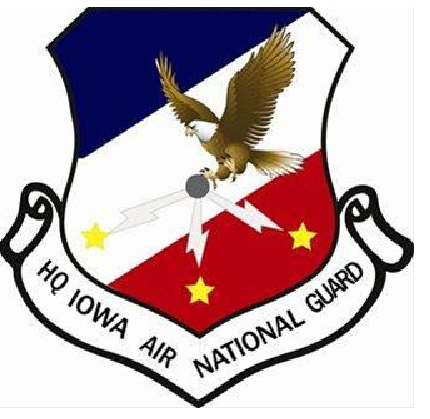
132nd Operations Group

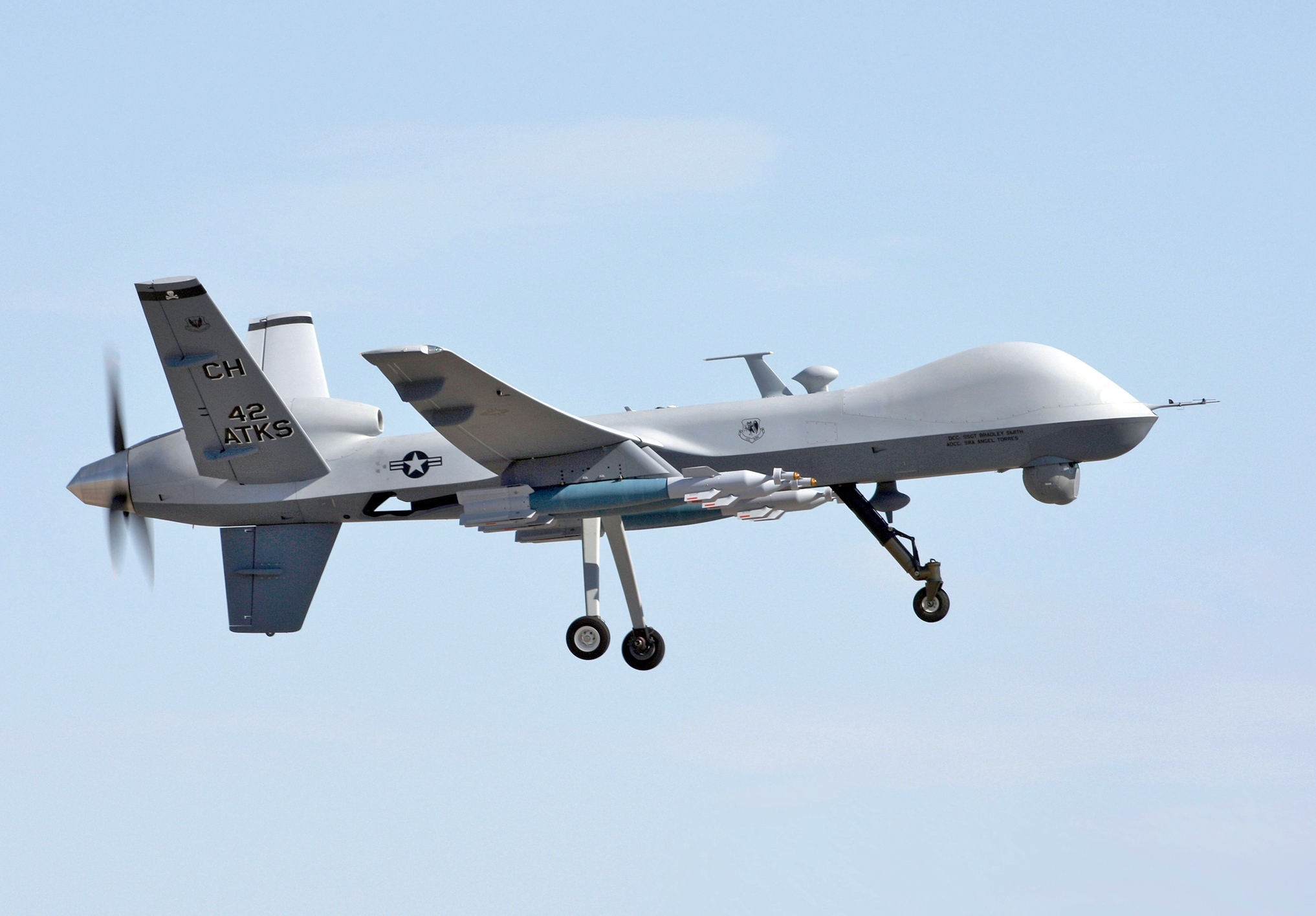
- An MQ-9 Reaper
- Active: 1943–1945; 1946–1953; 1953–1974; 1993–present
- Country: United States
- Allegiance: Iowa
- Branch: Air National Guard
- Type: Wing
- Role: Attack
- Part of: Iowa Air National Guard
- Garrison/HQ: Des Moines Air National Guard Base, Iowa
- Nickname: Hell Hawks (World War II) Hawkeyes
- Engagements: European Theater of Operations
- Decorations: Distinguished Unit Citation; Belgian Fourragere

Insignia
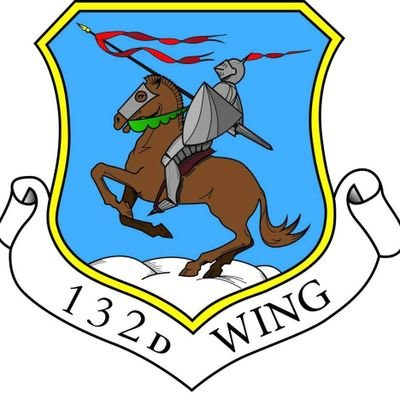
- 132nd Operations Group (Note: While assigned to the 132nd Wing, the group uses the wing emblem with the group designation on the scroll. AF Instruction 84-105, Organizational Lineage, Honors and History, 27 April 2017, paragraph 3.3.3.) emblem

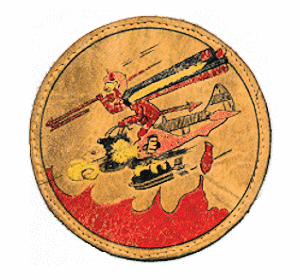
- 365th Fighter Group emblem
- Tail Stripe: Red and yellow checkerboard
- Tail code: IA

The 132nd Operations Group (Note: Officially, 132d Operations Group.) is a United States Air Force unit assigned to the Iowa Air National Guard located at Des Moines Air National Guard Base, Iowa. The 132nd was first activated during World War II as the 365th Fighter Group. After training in the United States, the group deployed to European Theater of Operations, where it engaged in combat until V-E Day. The 365th was awarded two Distinguished Unit Citations and the Belgian Fourragere for its combat actions. I September 1945, it returned to the United States and was inactivated.

In 1946, the group was redesignated the 132nd Fighter Group and allotted to the National Guard. Later that year, it was organized and federally recognized at Des Moines Municipal Airport. In April 1951, it was called to active duty for the Korean War, returning to state control in January 1953.

The group served as a fighter unit until inactivating in 1974, when Air National Guard group stationed on the same base as their parent wings were discontinued. It was reactivated as the 132nd Operations Group in 1993. In 2013, it traded its fighters for General Atomics MQ-9 Reaper unmanned aerial vehicles.

== History ==
=== World War II ===
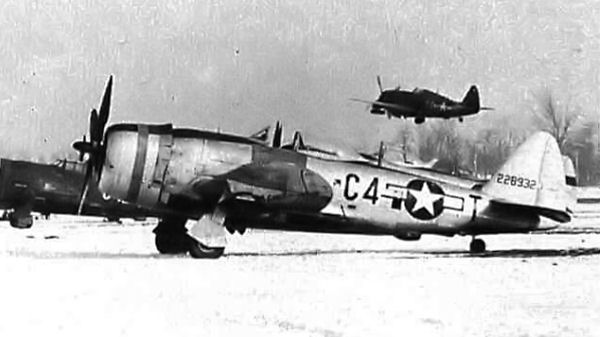
388th Fighteer Squadron P-47D Thunderbolt. (Note: Aircraft is Republic P-47D-28-RA Thunderbolt, serial 42-28932.)

==== Initial organization and training ====
The group was first activated at Richmond Army Air Base as the 365th Fighter Group in May 1943. Its components were the 386th, 387th, and 388th Fighter Squadrons. The squadron trained with Republic P-47 Thunderbolts. While Stationed at Dover Army Air Field, Delaware, the group flew gunnery training missions from Millville Army Air Field, New Jersey. In December 1943, when it sailed for the European Theater of Operations abouard the RMS Queen Elizabeth.

==== Combat in Europe ====
The group arrived at RAF Gosfield, England in late December 1943. It was several weeks before the 365th received a full complement of 75 P-47D Thunderbolts. Its first mission, flown on 22 February, was a bomber support sweep of short duration over enemy-held territory. On 2 March, the 365th had its first encounter with enemy fighters near Bastogne, resulting in the loss of one Thunderbolt and claims of six of the enemy shot down. In addition to escort missions, the group flew dive-bombing missions against bridges, airfields, rail facilities, gun emplacements preparing for Operation Overlord, the invasion of Normandy. On 5 March, the group moved south to RAF Beaulieu.

The group also tested tactics. It was instrumental in determining maximum bomb loads for the P-47. On 6 May four group pilots attacked V-1 flying bomb 'ski sites' with a 75 percent success rate and no lost aircraft. This demonstrated that low level fighter-bomber raids were more effective than heavy or medium bomber attacks.'

On D-Day, it attacked gun emplacements and lines of communications. The 365th Group began its move to the Continent, with two squadrons taking up residence at Azeville, France on 27 June, and the 388th arriving on 6 July. It continued dive bombing attacks, and gave air support for Operation Cobra, the breakout at Saint Lo. The group provided air support, primarily for First Army, during the drive across northern France. It flew patrols to defend the troop carrier units participating in Operation Market Garden, the airborne attacks in the Netherlands Arnhem.

The group received its first Distinguished Unit Citation (DUC) when, operating from Chievres Airfield, Belgium, it damaged and destroyed numerous enemy fighters near Bonn and Düsseldorf, Germany on 21 October 944 while supporting troops driving toward the Rhine. It was also cited in the Belgian Army order of the day for its actions through the beginning of the liberation of Belgium.

The German counterattack and the subsequent Battle of the Bulge led to the group being transferred from IX Tactical Air Command to XIX Tactical Air Command, to support the Third Army. The 365th attacked vehicles, rolling stock, marshalling yards, gun positions and factories in the Ardennes. These actions earned the group a second citation in the Belgian Army order of the day, resulting in the award of the Belgian Fourragere.

The group again provided cover for airborne operations duringOperation Varsity, the assault across the Rhine in March 1945. It moved into Germany on 16 March, becoming the first American fighter group to operate from Germany. The following month, on 20 April, It attacked airfields, transportation and ammunition dumps in southern Germany, earning a second DUC. The Hell Hawks flew combat through 4 May 1945. After V-E Day, the group took part in the disarmament program until June. It returned to the United States in September 1945 and was inactivated at Camp Myles Standish, Massachusetts on 22 September 1945.

365th Ftr Gp

Aerial Victories	Call Sign	Fuselage Code	Number	Note
Group Hq	Frosty		12
386th Fighter Squadron	Plastic	D5	59
387th Fighter Squadron	Bluebird	B4	17
388th Fighter Squadron	Elwood	C4	42.5
Group Total			130.5

=== Iowa Air National Guard ===
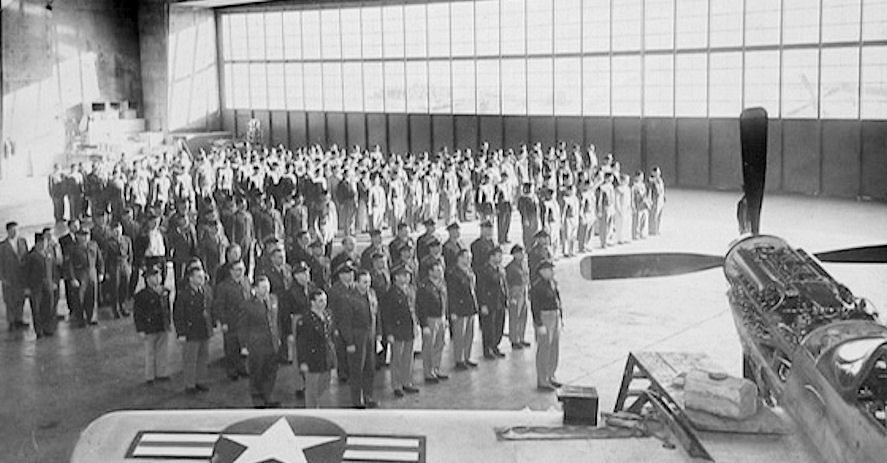
132nd Fighter Group formation in the 1940s

In May 1946, the group was redesignated the 132nd Fighter Group and allotted to the National Guard. The group was organized at Des Moines Municipal Airport, Iowa in June and federally recognized in late August and assigned to the 71st Fighter Wing. In addition to the 124th Fighter Squadron at Des Moines, the group was assigned two of its original squadrons, which had been renumbered and allotted to the National Guard, the 174th Fighter Squadron at Sioux City, Iowa and the 175th Fighter Squadron at Sioux Falls, South Dakota. The group was equipped with North American P-51 Mustangs, although one squadron upgraded to Republic F-84B Thunderjet fighters in early 1948.

==== Korean War federalization ====
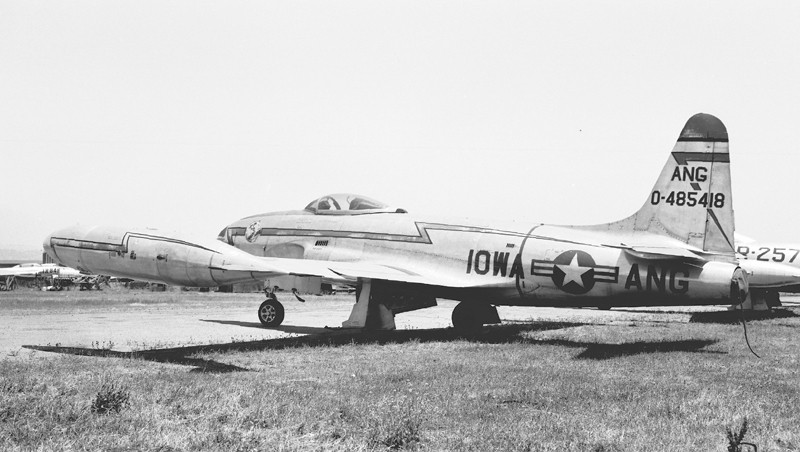
Group F-80C (Note: Aircraft was originally a Lockheed P-80A-5-LO Shooting Star, serial 44-85418. It was later modified to F-80C-11-LO standard. Dirkx, Marco (18 August 2025). "1944 USAF Serial Numbers". Joe Baugher’s Serial Number List..)

In the fall of 1950, The National Guard reorganized under the Wing Base Organization System used by the regular Air Force. Under this system combat groups and the units supporting them were combined under a single wing. On 1 November, the group was assigned to the new 132nd Fighter Wing The 132nd Wing was activated for the Korean War on 1 April 1951 and assigned to Strategic Air Command, which moved it to Dow Air Force Base, Maine. In November, it moved to Alexandria Air Force Base, Louisiana and transferred to Tactical Air Command (TAC). There it trained replacement pilots in F-51D Mustang ground support operations, also deployed unit members to Japan and Korea to fly combat missions. On 1 January 1953, the group transferred its personnel and equipment to the 366th Fighter-Bomber Group and was inactivated and returned to the National Guard.

==== Cold War ====
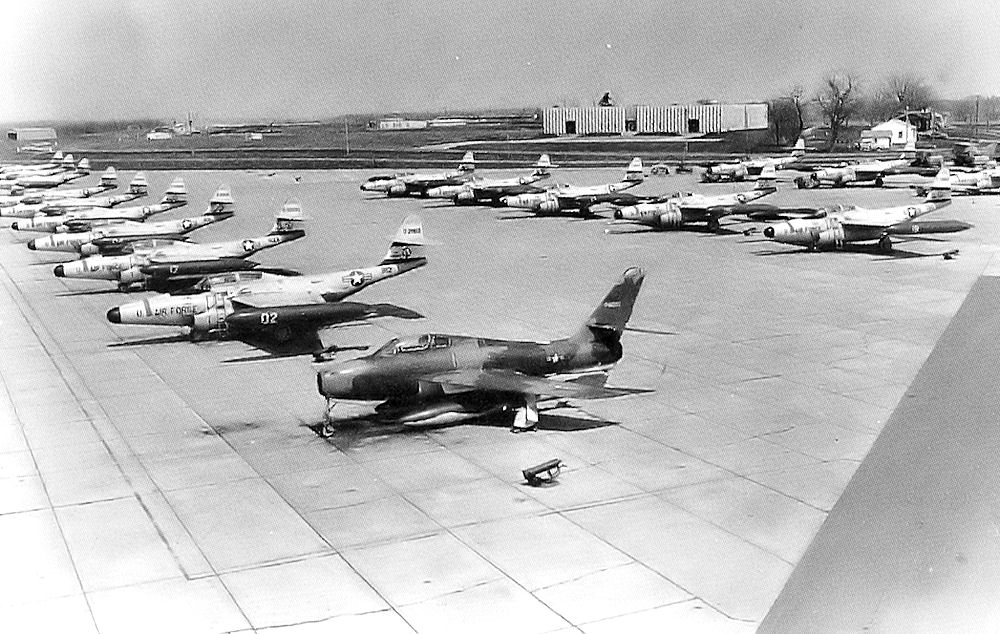
Group F-89J Scorpions and its first F-84F Thunderstreak

After returning to Des Moines, the group was re-equipped with Lockheed F-80C Shooting Star jet fighters and returned to normal peacetime training. Despite its fighter-bomber designation, its mission was air defense. This was recognized in July 1955, when it was designated the 132nd Fighter-Interceptor Group. The same year it upgraded to newer Republic F-84E Thunderjets 1955. The group's gunnery team won the Air National Guard gunnery meet that year, as well.

In April 1956, the group was reorganized along the lines of Air Defense Command's regular units, becoming the 132nd Fighter Group (Air Defense). The group's 173rd Squadron at Lincoln made a similar change in July 1960, when it was assigned to the new 155th Fighter Group (Air Defense). Meanwhile, in April 1958, the 174th Squadron at Sioux City became a tactical reconnaissance unit and was reassigned to the 118th Tactical Reconnaissance Group. The group and its remaining 124th Fighter-Interceptor Squadron upgraded to the all-weather North American F-86L Sabre, which was equipped with data link, which enabled it to be controlled by Semi-Automatic Ground Environment direction centers in 1958. The group's F-86Ls were replaced with Northrop F-89J Scorpion interceptors, which were capable of firing the nuclear armed AIR-2 Genie. With the F-89, the group assumed a 24 hour air defense alert commitment.

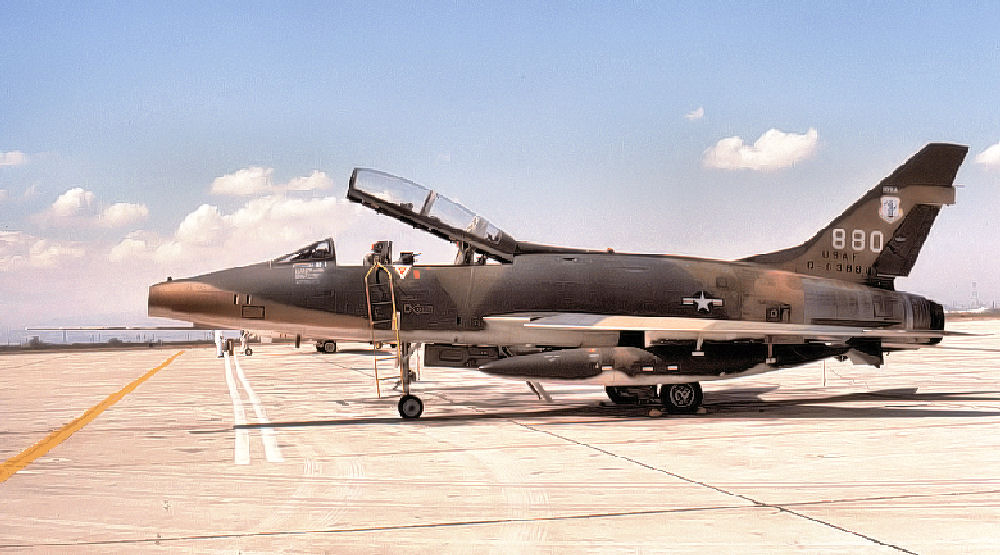
Group F-100 Super Sabre (Note: Aircraft is North American F-100F-10-NA Super Sabre, serial 56-3880. This airplane was retired to the Military Aircraft Storage and Disposition Center on 12 August 1977, but returned to service. It was retired a second time on 11 April 1999. It is on display at Joint Base Andrews, Maryland. Dirkx, Marco (23 September 2025). "1956 USAF Serial Numbers". Joe Baugher’s Serial Number List.)

The group became the 132nd Tactical Fighter Group in 1969, when it was equipped with second-line Republic F-84F Thunderstreaks. (Note: The group also flew some RF-84F Thunderflashes.) The 132nd upgraded to the North American F-100D Super Sabre aircraft, which were returning from South Vietnam in 1971, and being transferred to the Air National Guard to replace the subsonic F-84s. In the 1970s, Guard groups located on the same base as their parent wing were viewed as an unneeded level of management, and the group was inactivated on 9 December 1974.

==== Reactivation ====
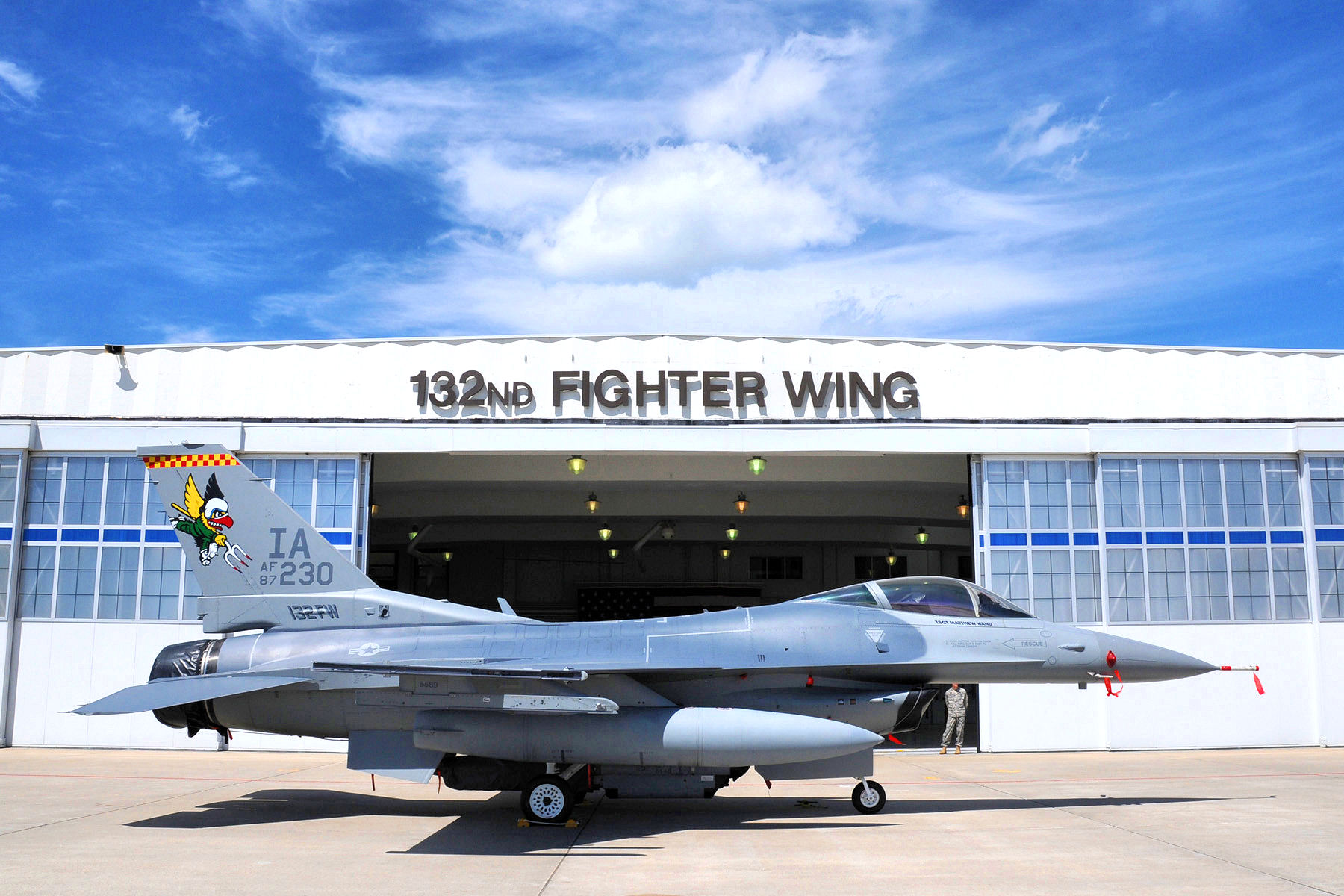
132nd Fighter Squadron - General Dynamics F-16C Block 30F Fighting Falcon 87-0230

In the early 1990s, the Air Force reorganized under the Objective Wing mode. As a result, the group was redesignated the 132nd Operations Group and activated with F-16C Fighting Falcons. Between 1996 and 2004, the group deployed F-16s and personnel to air expeditionary forces patrolling the no fly zones over Iraq. Following the September 11th attacks, the group once again began standing alert. In 2005, group personnel and aircraft deployed to Al Udeid Air Base to support Operation Enduring Freedom.

However, congressional actions removed the wing's fighters from the base, with the transition beginning in FY 2013. The last regularly scheduled F-16 flights occurred in August 2013, after which the unit's F-16s were transferred to the New Jersey Air National Guard's 177th Fighter Wing at Atlantic City Air National Guard Base.

The group now operates the General Atomics MQ-9 Reaper, a remotely piloted aircraft. Aircrew based and physically located in Des Moines carry out missions in all corners of the world. These aircrews provide real-time full-motion video and flexible strike capabilities to combatant commanders around the globe.

== Lineage ==
132nd Fighter Group

- Constituted as the 365th Fighter Group on 27 April 1943

Activated on 15 May 1943
Inactivated on 22 September 1945
Redesignated 132nd Fighter Group and allotted to the National Guard on 24 May 1946<
Organized on 10 June 1946
Extended federal recognition on 23 August 1946
Ordered into active service on 1 April 1951
Redesignated 132nd Fighter-Bomber Group on 1 June 1951
Inactivated on 1 January 1953
Activated in the Air National Guard on 1 January 1953
Redesignated 132nd Fighter-Interceptor Group on 1 July 1955
Redesignated 132nd Fighter Group (Air Defense) on 15 April 1956
Consolidated with the 132nd Tactical Fighter Group

132nd Operations Group
Established as the 132nd Tactical Fighter Group
Activated on 1 August 1969
Inactivated on 9 December 1974
Consolidated with the 132nd Fighter Group
Redesignated 132nd Operations Group on 15 March 1992
Activated c. 1 January 1993

=== Assignments ===
- I Fighter Command, 15 May 1943
- Philadelphia Fighter Wing, 19 July – 4 December 1943
- 70th Fighter Wing, 22 December 1943
- 84th Fighter Wing, 1 May 1944
- 70th Fighter Wing, 1 October 1944
- XIX Tactical Air Command, 16 January 1945
- IX Tactical Air Command, 1 February – 11 September 1945
- Army Service Forces, Port of Embarkation 20–22 September 1945
- 71st Fighter Wing, 23 August 1946
- 132nd Fighter Wing (later 132nd Fighter-Bomber Wing), 1 November 1950 – 1 January 1953
- 132nd Fighter-Bomber Wing (later 132nd Fighter-Interceptor Wing, 132nd Air Defense Wing, 132nd Tactical Fighter Wing), 1 January 1953 – 9 January 1974
- 132nd Fighter Wing (later 132nd Wing), c. 1 January 1993 – present

=== Components ===
- 124th Fighter Squadron (later 124th Fighter-Bomber Squadron, 124th Fighter-Interceptor Squadron, 124th Tactical Fighter Squadron, 124th Fighter Squadron, 124th Attack Squadron): 10 June 1946 – 1 January 1953, 1 January 1953 – 31 July 1969, 1 August 1969 – 9 January 1974, c. 1 January 1973 – present
- 173d Fighter Squadron (later 173rd Fighter-Bomber Squadron, 173rd Fighter-Interceptor Squadron): 1948 – 1 January 1953, 1 January 1953 – 1 July 1960
- 386th Fighter Squadron (later 174th Fighter Squadron: 174th Fighter-Bomber Squadron, 174th Fighter-Interceptor Squadron), 15 May 1943 – 22 September 1945, 12 September 1946 – 1 January 1953, 1 January 1953 – 10 April 1958
- 387th Fighter Squadron (later 175th Fighter Squadron): 15 May 1943 – 22 September 1945, 20 September 1946 – 1948
- 388th Fighter Squadron, 15 May 1943 – 22 September 1945

=== Stations ===
- Richmond Army Air Base, Virginia, 15 May 1943
- Langley Field, Virginia, 19 July 1943
- Dover Army Air Field, Delaware, 11 August 1943
- Richmond Army Air Base, Virginia, 18 November – 4 December 1943
- RAF Gosfield (Station 154), England, 22 December 1943
- RAF Beaulieu (Station 408), England, 5 March 1944
- Azeville Airfield (A-7), France, 28 June 1944
- Lignerolles Airfield (A-12), France, 15 August 1944
- Bretigny Airfield (A-48), France, 3 September 1944
- Juvincourt Airfield (A-68), France, 15 September 1944
- Chievres Airfield (A-84), Belgium, 4 October 1944
- Metz Airfield (Y-34), France, 27 December 1944
- Florennes/Juzaine Airfield (A-78), Belgium, 30 January 1945
- Aachen Airfield (Y-46), Germany, 16 March 1945
- Fritzlar Airfield (Y-86), Germany, 13 April 1945
- Suippes, France, c. 29 July 1945
- Antwerp, Belgium, c. 22 August – 11 September 1945
- Camp Myles Standish, Massachusetts, 20–22 September 1945
- Des Moines Municipal Airport, Iowa, 23 Aug 1946
- Dow Air Force Base, Maine, 1 April 1951
- Alexandria Air Force Base, Louisiana, 5 November 1952 – 1 January 1953
- Des Moines Municipal Airport (later Des Moines Air National Guard Base), Iowa, 1 January 1953 – present

=== Aircraft ===
- Republic P-47hunderbolt, 1943–1945
- North American P-51D (later F-51) Mustang, 1946–1953
- Republic F-84B Thunderjet, 1949–1951
- Lockheed F-80C Shooting Star, 1953–1956
- Republic F-84E Thunderjet, 1956–1958
- North American F-86L Sabre Interceptor, 1958–1962
- Northrop F-89J Scorpion, 1962–1969
- Republic F-84F Thunderstreak, 1969-1971
- North American F-100 Super Sabre, 1971–1974
- General Dynamics F-16 Fighting Falcon, 1993–2013
- General Atomics MQ-9 Reaper, 2013–present
