= Distributed Training Operations Center =

Coordinates: 41.440°N 93.658°W

The Distributed Training Operations Center (DTOC) also known as Detachment 1, 132nd Wing (132 WG), Iowa Air National Guard, is the "support nexus" of the Air National Guard's Distributed Mission Operations (DMO). It is the only U.S. Department of Defense (DoD) unit providing daily tactical distributed mission training (DMT) events for Active, Guard, Reserve, and joint operations.

The DTOC is located at Des Moines Air National Guard Base in Des Moines, Iowa. The primary mission of the DTOC is to provide persistent DMO capability, expertise and staffing for the execution of DMO events consisting of realistic, relevant training opportunities to warfighters in a networked environment. It also conducts tests and provides technical and analytical expertise in support of networked operations.

DMO is a component of the Air Force Training Transformation initiative, which is part of the larger DoD Training Transformation (T2) initiative. The DTOC organizes DMO events primarily for Air National Guard (ANG) and Air Force Reserve Command (AFRC) pilots, combat systems officers, air battle managers, and enlisted aircrew, as well as ground-based tactical air control parties (TACP) and special tactics squadrons (STS). It enables flight crews and tactical ground personnel from throughout the United States and the world to train together in a virtual world for combat missions. The DTOC facilitates training between Air National Guard and Air Force Reserve pilots and flight crews, and other warfighters in the U.S. Army, U.S. Navy, U.S. Marine Corps, and other aviation and non-aviation forces.

The National Guard and Reserve Equipment (NG&RE) Report for Fiscal Year 2008, reported that the, "...ANG established the first Distributed Warfare Detachment in the Air Force at the [then-]132nd Fighter Wing (132 FW) to house the Distributed Training Operations Center (DTOC). The DTOC’s one-of-a-kind capabilities and mission will grow to keep pace with the scope of Distributed Mission Operations (DMO) in the Air Force over the next four years. As the Guard’s DMO lynchpin, the DTOC will provide the operational environment for a virtual battlespace linking a wide array of high fidelity flight and mission crew simulators. The DTOC is responsible for all network management, event control, scenario development, unit DMO scheduling, remote maintenance, remote instruction, and realistic threat insertion. In addition, the DTOC manages the distributed network called ARCNET. The Mission Training Engineering Center (MTEC), collocated with the Air Force Research Laboratory (AFRL) in Mesa, Arizona, coordinates technology programs with AFRL, and acts as the engineering focal point for the Air Reserve Component (ARC, i.e., the combination of the ANG and AFRC) to exploit and transition leading edge technology into hardware or software solutions."

Previously known as ReserveNet when it was limited to AFRC, ReserveNet was renamed the Air Reserve Component Network (ARCNET) in 2009 when ANG units were incorporated into the network and the DTOC assumed its management.
