= 132nd Division =

In military terms, 132nd Division may refer to:

== Infantry Divisions ==
- 132nd Division (People's Republic of China)
- 132nd Infantry Division (Wehrmacht), Germany
- 132nd Division (Imperial Japanese Army)
- 132nd Rifle Division, Soviet Union

== Armoured Divisions ==
- 132nd Armored Division "Ariete", Italy

== See also ==
- List of military divisions by number
- 132nd Brigade (disambiguation)
- 132nd Regiment (disambiguation)
- 132nd (disambiguation)
