= 124th Attack Squadron =

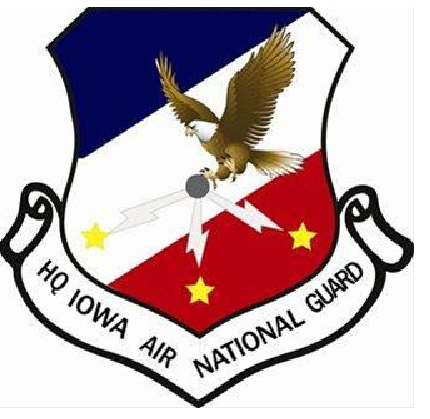
124th Attack Squadron

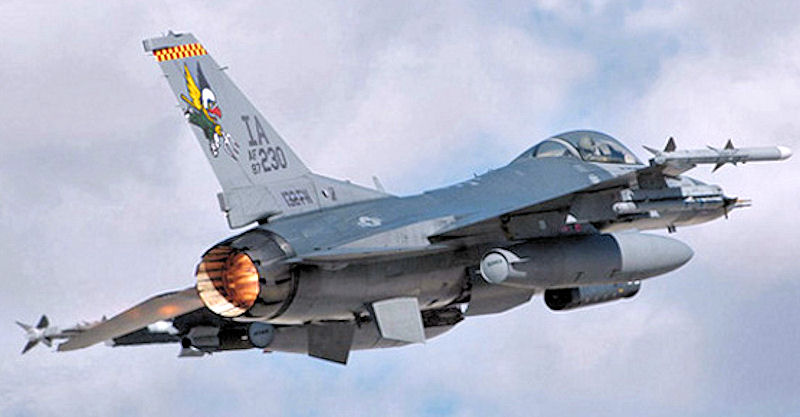
- 124th Fighter Squadron F-16 87-230
- Active: 1941-1944; 1946–1953; 1953–1969; 1969–present
- Country: United States
- Allegiance: Iowa
- Branch: Air National Guard
- Type: Squadron
- Role: Attack
- Part of: Iowa Air National Guard
- Garrison/HQ: Des Moines International Airport, Iowa
- Nickname: Hawkeyes
- Engagements: World War II

Insignia
- 124th Fighter Squadron emblem

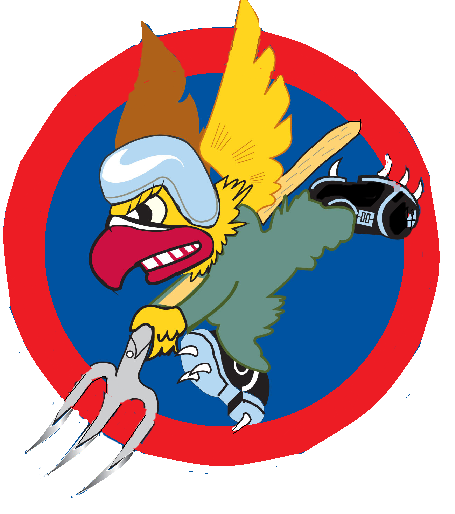
- 124th Fighter-Bomber Squadron emblem (Note: Approved 8 October 1952.)

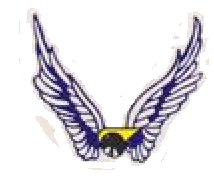
- 124th Observation Squadron emblem
- Tail code: IA
- Tail stripe

The 124th Attack Squadron is a unit of the Iowa Air National Guard 132nd Wing. It is assigned to Des Moines International Airport (Des Moines ANGB), Iowa and was formerly equipped with F-16 Fighting Falcon aircraft. The unit is reequipping with the MQ-9 Reaper.

The squadron is a descendant organization of the 124th Observation Squadron, established on 30 July 1940. It is one of the 29 original National Guard Observation Squadrons of the United States Army National Guard formed before World War II.

== History ==
=== World War II ===
Efforts to form an Iowa National Guard aviation unit in Des Moines were led by a citizens' committee, which was formed in May 1940, to arrange for construction of an aircraft hangar and armory building at the Des Moines Airport. This non-profit committee consisted of local business, civic and military leaders. Through the work of this committee, which included conferences in Washington DC, and design and financing of the project, an Air Corps squadron for Des Moines was authorized by President Franklin D. Roosevelt in January 1941. Recruiting of members for the new unit began the following month. The 124th Observation Squadron was organized on 25 February 1941 with an allotted strength of 31 officers and 116 enlisted personnel.

The 124th was a light observation squadron, flying North American O-47 twin-seat observation monoplanes. Ordered to active service in September was initially an aviation unit at Fort Leavenworth, Kansas as part of the U.S. Army Command and General Staff College. After the Japanese Attack on Pearl Harbor, was attached to Army Air Forces Antisubmarine Command and deployed to several airfields along the Texas and Louisiana Gulf Coast, flying Antisubmarine patrols, Apr 1942 – Jan 1943. After the Navy took over the antisubmarine mission performed replacement reconnaissance pilot training, Mar 1943 – Apr 1944 at Tullaholma, Tennessee with P-39 Airacobra, P-40 Warhawk and P-51 Mustangs. Inactivated as part of an administrative reorganization of training units in May 1944.

=== Iowa Air National Guard ===
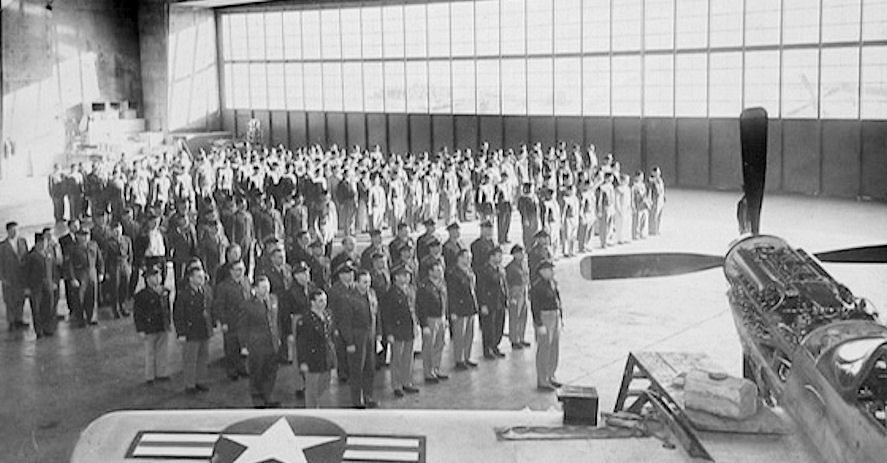
124th Fighter Squadron formation 1940s

Was transferred to the new Iowa Air National Guard in May 1946 and became a P-51D Mustang squadron, receiving federal recognition on 23 August 1946, one of the first Air National Guard squadrons activated. Assigned to Des Moines Municipal Airport, a former training field during World War II used as an Aircraft/Crew processing center for heavy bomber crews. Was assigned to the Iowa ANG 132d Fighter Wing, which consisted of the 124th, along with the 127th Fighter Squadron at Sioux City, and the Nebraska ANG 173d Fighter Squadron at Lincoln, Nebraska. Engaged in routine training exercises, and was upgraded to F-84B Thunderjet jet aircraft in early 1948.

Activated to Federal Service during the Korean War, sent to Dow AFB, Maine Used by TAC to train replacement pilots in F-51D Mustang ground support operations, also deployed unit members to Japan and Korea to fly combat missions.

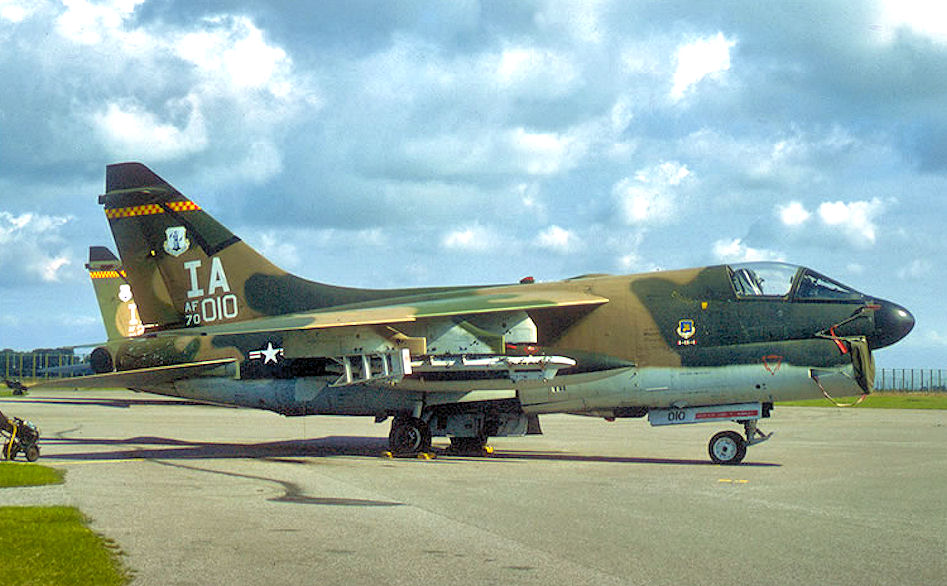
124th Tactical Fighter Squadron A-7D 70-1010 about 1979

The 132d was moved to Alexandria AFB, Louisiana in May 1952 again with F-51s replacing the federalized Oklahoma ANG 137th Fighter-Bomber Wing which was deployed to France. Performed training as a tactical fighter unit until relieved from active service and returned to Iowa ANG jurisdiction in January 1953.

During 1952, over one million dollars of federally funded improvements were added to the Des Moines airport. The work included the addition of 1,800 feet to the main runway and 3,480 feet of taxiways to better accommodate the 124th receiving jet aircraft upon their return to peacetime service. After returning to Des Moines, was re-equipped with F-80C Shooting Star jet fighter-bombers and returned to normal peacetime training committed to Tactical Air Command. Was later upgraded to newer F-84E Thuderjets in 1955. Was transferred to Air Defense Command in July 1958, becoming an all-weather F-86L Sabre Interceptor squadron, its new mission being the air defense of Des Moines and eastern Iowa. The Sabres were replaced in 1962 with F-89J Scorpion Interceptors, which the squadron flew until the summer of 1969.

Was transferred back to TAC in 1969, being re-equipped with second-line F-84F Thunderstreaks, the standard TAC aircraft for its Air National Guard-gained squadrons at the time. Upgraded to the F-100D Super Sabre, which were returning from South Vietnam in 1971 and being transferred to the ANG to replace the subsonic F-84s. Began receiving new and transferred A-7D Corsair II ground attack aircraft in 1976 when the National Guard Bureau began modernizing the ANG with frontline aircraft after the drawdown of the regular Air Force after the end of the Vietnam War.

=== Modern era ===
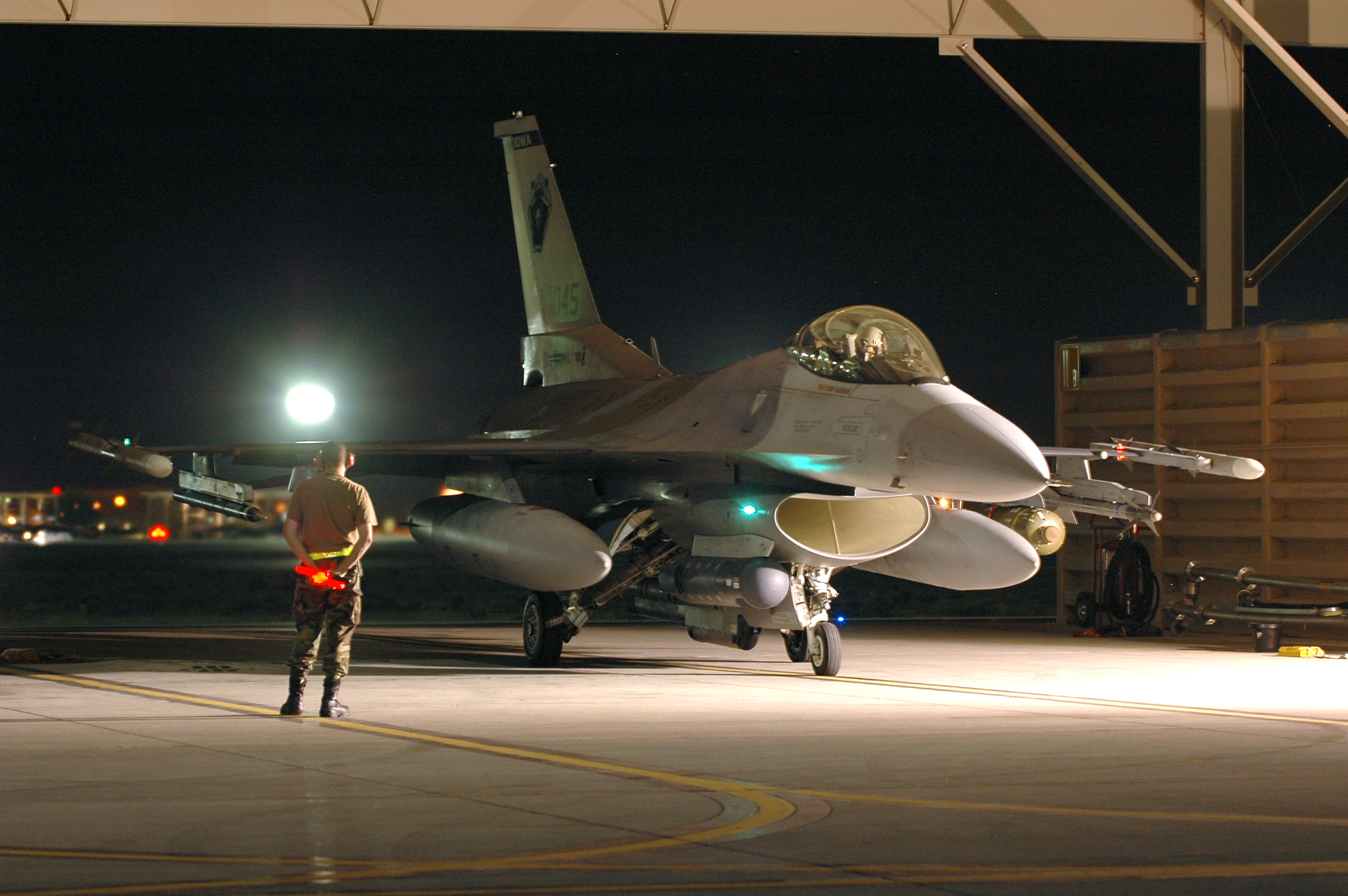
A crew chief from the 132nd FW waits to marshal F-16C block 42 #89-2045 of the 124th FS during Red Flag 06-02 at Nellis AFB on 15 August 2006

With the retirement of the A-7Ds in the late 1980s, was upgraded to Block 42 F-16C Fighting Falcons in 1990. From 1998 to 2004 as part of the Air Expeditionary Force concept with an unprecedented six overseas contingency deployments to patrol the No-Fly Zone over Iraq in Operations Northern and Southern Watch. Two of the six contingency deployments occurred within a ten-month period, attesting to the unit’s professionalism and high state of readiness.

Immediately following the events of September 11, 2001, the 124th Fighter Squadron's F-16s, pilots, and maintenance members were placed on alert, poised to defend against any possible attacks. After 9/11 the unit’s F-16s were prepared to launch within minutes in the event of a “scramble” order – 24/7. The unit has also provided continuous Combat Air Patrols during Presidential visits.

The unit deployed to Al Udeid AB, Qatar in 2005 in support of Operation Enduring Freedom and Operation Iraqi Freedom. Total flying hours during this contingency equaled to over three-fourths of a year’s normal flying allocation in only 52 days.

In 2013, the 124th's 21 F-16s were transferred to the 119th Fighter Squadron, 177th Fighter Wing, New Jersey Air National Guard, at Atlantic City Air National Guard Base, bringing to an end 72 years of manned flight by the 124th.

The squadron is re-equipping with the MQ-9 Reaper unmanned aerial vehicle, and was redesignated the 124th Attack Squadron after 2016.

=== Operations and decorations ===
- Combat Operations: World War II
- Campaigns:

Antisubmarine patrols, Apr 1942 – Jan 1943
Operation Northern Watch
Operation Southern Watch
Operation Enduring Freedom
Operation Iraqi Freedom

== Lineage ==
- Designated as the 124th Observation Squadron and allotted to the National Guard on 30 July1940

Activated on 25 February 1941
Ordered to active service on 15 Sep 1941
Redesignated 124th Observation Squadron (Light) on 13 January 1942
Redesignated 124th Observation Squadron on 4 Jul 1942
Redesignated 124th Reconnaissance Squadron (Fighter) on 2 Apr 1943
Redesignated 124th Tactical Reconnaissance Squadron on 11 Aug 1942
Disbanded on 1 May 1944
Reconstituted on 21 June 1945
Redesignated 124th Fighter Squadron, Single Engine and allotted to the National Guard on 24 May 1946
Activated on 10 June 1946
Extended Federal recognition on 23 August 1946
Ordered into active service on 1 April 1951
Redesignated 124th Fighter-Bomber Squadron on 1 June 1951
Inactivated, relieved from active duty and returned to Iowa state control on 1 January 1953
Redesignated 124th Fighter-Interceptor Squadron on 1 July 1955
Inactivated on 31 July 1969
Consolidated with the 124th Tactical Fighter Squadron on 18 August 1987

- Constituted as the 124th Tactical Fighter Squadron and allotted to the Air National Guard on 1 May 1969

Activated on 1 August 1969
Consolidated with the 124th Fighter-Interceptor Squadron on 18 August 1987
Redesignated 124th Fighter Squadron on 15 Mar 1992
Redesignated 124th Attack Squadron

=== Assignments ===
- Iowa National Guard, 25 Feb 1941
- II Air Support Command, 15 Sep 1941
- 72d Observation Group, 26 Sep 1941
- 75th Observation Group (later 75th Reconnaissance Group, 75thTactical Reconnaissance Group), 12 Mar 1942 – 1 May 1944 (attached to I Bomber Command, 3 July 1942, AAF Antisubmarine Command, 15 October 1942 26th Antisubmarine Wing, 20 Nov 1942 – 4 Jan 1943)
- 132d Fighter Group (later 132d Fighter-Bomber Group), 23 August 1946 – 1 January 1953
- 132d Fighter-Bomber Group (later 132d Fighter Group), 1 Jan 1953 – 31 July 1969
- 132d Tactical Fighter Group (later 132d Fighter Group), 1 August 1969
- 132d Fighter Wing, 1 Oct 1995–present

=== Stations ===
- Des Moines Airport, Iowa, 25 Feb 1941
- Sherman Field, Kansas, 26 Sep 1941
- Ellington Field, Texas, 17 Apr 1942
- Galveston Army Air Field, Texas, 24 Jul 1942
- New Orleans Army Air Base, Louisiana, 10 Sep 1942
- William Northern Army Air Field, Tennessee, 11 Mar 1943
- Key Field, Mississippi, 17 Aug 1943 – 1 May 1944
- Des Moines Municipal Airport, Iowa, 23 August 1946
- Dow Air Force Base, Maine, 1 April 1951
- Alexandria Air Force Base, Louisiana, 5 November 1952 – 1 January 1953
- Des Moines Municipal Airport, Iowa, 1 January 1953 – 31 July 1969
- Des Moines Municipal Airport (later Des Moines Air National Guard Base), Iowa, 1 August 1969 – present

=== Aircraft ===
- North American O-47, 1941-1943
- L-4 Grasshopper, 1942-1943
- Included O-31, O-38, O-46, O-49, YO-50 and O-52 during the period 1941-1942
- P-39 Airacobra, P-40 Warhawk and P-51 Mustang, 1943-1944
- P-51D Mustang, 1946-1949
- F-84B Thunderjet, 1949-1951
- F-51D Mustang, 1951-1953
- F-80C Shooting Star, 1953-1956
- F-84E Thunderjet, 1956-1958
- F-86L Sabre Interceptor, 1958-1962
- F-89J Scorpion, 1962-1969
- F-84F Thunderstreak, 1969-1971
- F-100 Super Sabre, 1971-1977
- A-7D Corsair II, 1977-1992
- F-16 Fighting Falcon, 1992-2013

== See also ==
- List of United States Army National Guard Observation Squadrons
