= 132nd (Highland) Regiment of Foot =

- Active: 1794–1796
- Country: Kingdom of Great Britain
- Branch: British Army
- Type: Line Infantry
- Role: Infantry

The 132nd (Highland) Regiment of Foot was a Scottish infantry regiment of the British Army, created in 1794 and disbanded in 1796. The regiment was raised by Duncan Cameron of Cullart, and did not see any active service; it served solely to recruit soldiers. On disbandment, the recruits were drafted into the Black Watch.
