= 132nd Wing =

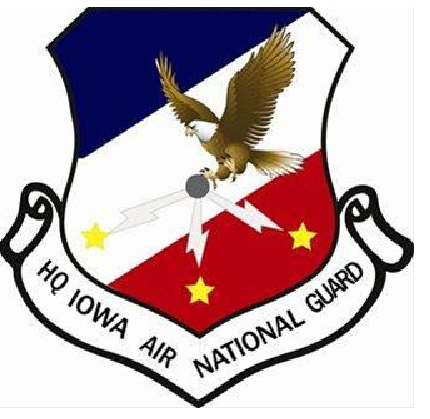
132nd Wing

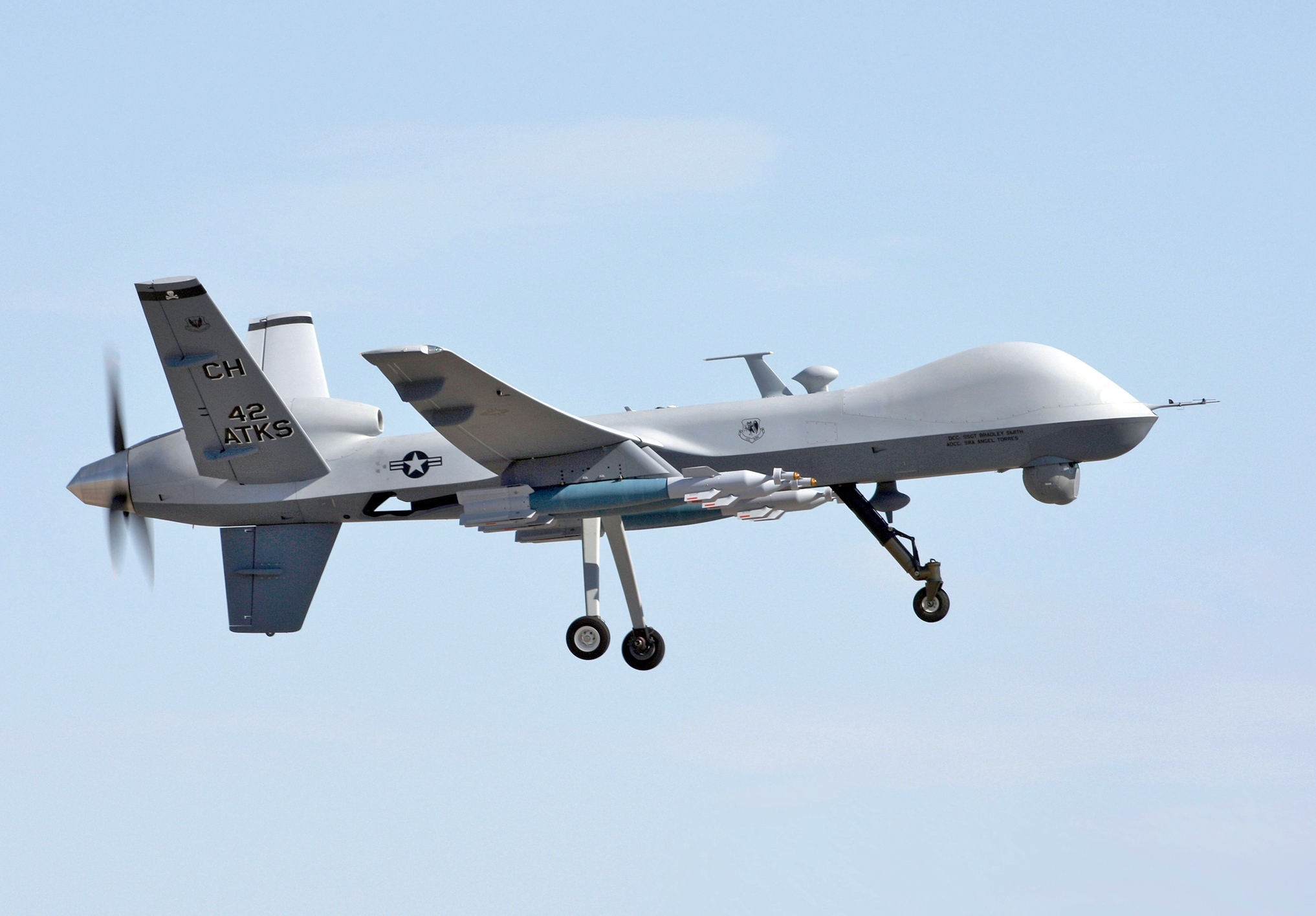
- An MQ-9 Reaper, 2008
- Active: 1950–1953; 1953–present
- Country: United States
- Allegiance: Iowa
- Branch: Air National Guard
- Type: Wing
- Role: Attack / Intelligence
- Size: 900
- Part of: Iowa Air National Guard
- Garrison/HQ: Des Moines Air National Guard Base, Iowa
- Nickname: "Hawkeyes"
- Engagements: European Theater of Operations
- Decorations: Air Force Outstanding Unit Award
- Website: https://www.132dwing.ang.af.mil/

Commanders
- Current commander: Colonel Anthony S. Bradley
- Notable commanders: Carroll W. McColpin

Insignia
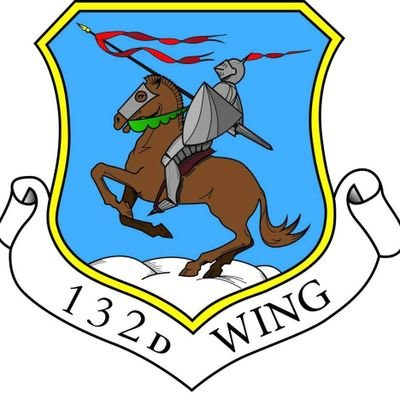
- 132nd Wing emblem
- Tail Stripe: Red and yellow checkerboard
- Tail code: IA

The 132nd Wing (Note: Officially, 132d Wing.)is a United States Air Force unit assigned to the Iowa Air National Guard and located at Des Moines Air National Guard Base, Iowa. After having operated manned fighter aircraft for all of its prior history, the wing was equipped with the MQ-9 Reaper unmanned aerial vehicle in 2013.

== Units ==
The units of the 132nd Wing include:

- 132nd Operations Group (132 OG)
  - 124th Attack Squadron - General Atomics MQ-9 Reaper Tail Code: "IA" (124 ATKS)
  - 168th Cyberspace Operations Squadron (168 COS)
- 132nd Intelligence, Surveillance and Reconnaissance Group (132 ISRG)
  - 232nd Intelligence Squadron (232 IS)
  - 233rd Intelligence Squadron (233 IS)
  - 132nd Intelligence Support Squadron (132 ISS)
- 132nd Mission Support Group (132 MSG)
  - 132nd Communications Flight (132 CF)
  - 132nd Security Forces Squadron (132 SFS)
  - 132nd Force Support Squadron (132 FSS)
  - 132nd Civil Engineer Squadron (132 CES)
  - 132nd Logistics Readiness Squadron (132 LRS)
- 132nd Medical Group (132 MDG)
- 132nd Wing, Detachment 1 (132 WG Det 1) - Distributed Training Operations Center

== History ==
In the fall of 1950, the National Guard reorganized its units according to the Wing Base Organization adopted by the regular Air Force in 1948. In this organization, tactical groups were combined with their support units under a single wing. On 1 October 1950, the 132nd Fighter Wing was organized as the headquarters for the 132nd Fighter Group, 132nd Air Base Group, 132d Maintenance & Supply Group, and 132nd Medical Group.

=== Korean War federalization ===
Activated to Federal Service during the Korean War, sent to Dow Air Force Base, Maine. Used by TAC to train replacement pilots in F-51D Mustang ground support operations, also deployed unit members to Japan and Korea to fly combat missions.

The Wing was moved to Alexandria Air Force Base, Louisiana in May 1952 again with F-51s replacing the federalized Oklahoma ANG 137th Fighter-Bomber Wing which was deployed to France. Performed training as a tactical fighter unit until relieved from active service and returned to Iowa ANG jurisdiction in January 1953.

==== Cold War ====
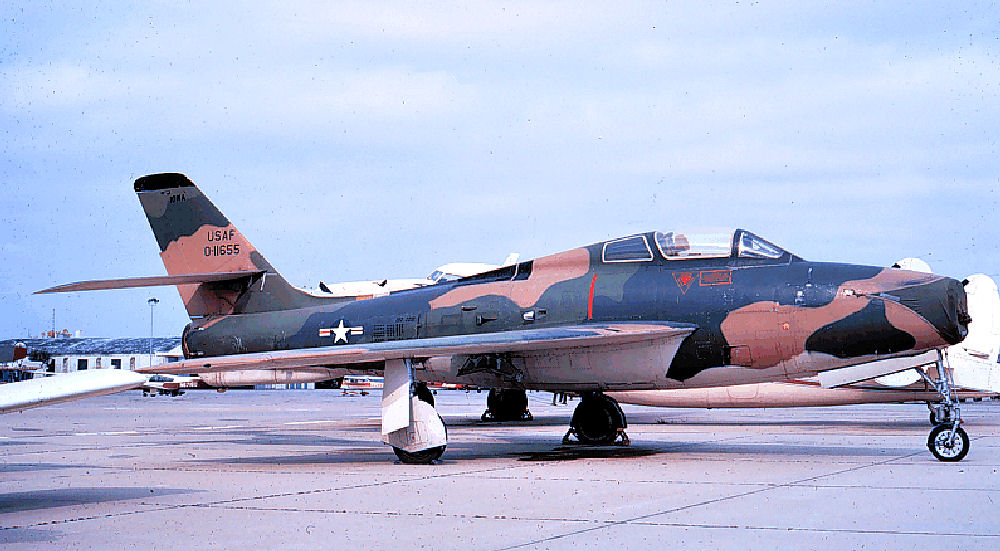
124th TFS Republic F-84F-25-RE Thunderstreak, AF Ser. No. 51-1655, about 1970

During 1952, over one million dollars of federally funded improvements were added to the Des Moines airport. The work included the addition of 1,800 feet to the main runway and 3,480 feet of taxiways to better accommodate the wing receiving jet aircraft upon their return to peacetime service. After returning to Des Moines, the wing was re-equipped with F-80C Shooting Star jet fighter-bombers and returned to normal peacetime training committed to Tactical Air Command. It was later upgraded with newer F-84E Thunderjets in 1955. The wing was transferred to Air Defense Command in July 1958, becoming an all-weather F-86L Sabre Interceptor squadron, its new mission being the air defense of Des Moines and eastern Iowa.

In June 1960, the Lincoln, Nebraska-based 173rd FIS was reassigned to the new Nebraska ANG 155th Fighter-Interceptor Group when the squadron was expanded to a group-level organization. In a similar reassignment, the Sioux City-based 174th FIS was reassigned to the 185th Tactical Fighter Group on 30 September 1962. The F-86Ls of the remaining 124th FIS were replaced with F-89J Scorpion Interceptors, which the squadron flew until the summer of 1969.

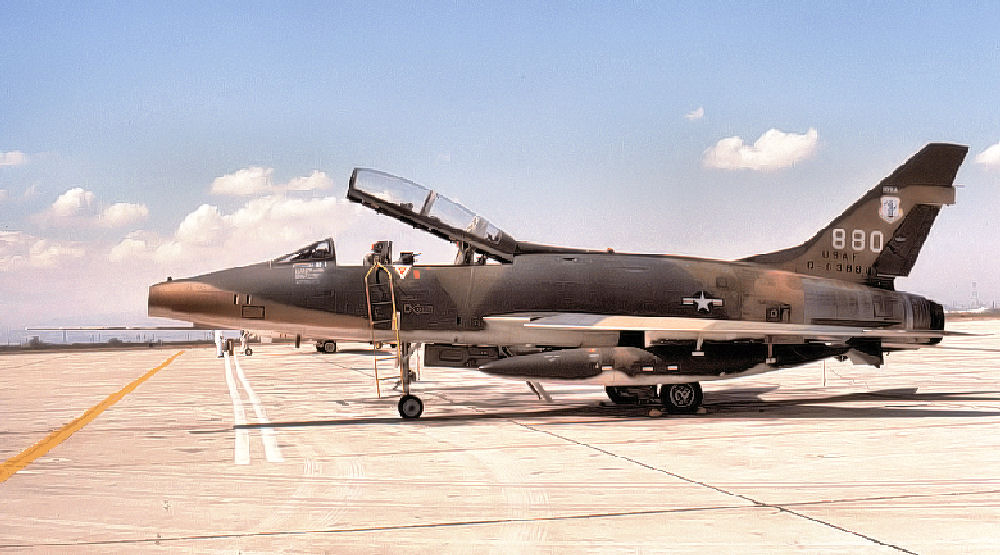
124th TFS North American F-100F-10-NA Super Sabre, AF Ser. No. 56-3880, 1975

The 132nd was transferred back to TAC in 1969, being re-equipped with second-line F-84F Thunderstreaks, the standard TAC aircraft for its Air National Guard-gained squadrons at the time. The 132nd upgraded to the F-100D Super Sabre aircraft, which were returning from South Vietnam in 1971, and being transferred to the ANG to replace the subsonic F-84's. The wing began receiving new and transferred A-7D Corsair II ground attack aircraft in 1976 when the National Guard Bureau began modernizing the ANG with frontline aircraft after the drawdown of the regular Air Force following the end of the Vietnam War.

With the retirement of the A-7Ds in the late 1980s, the wing was upgraded to Block 42 F-16C Fighting Falcons in 1990. From 1998 to 2004, as part of the Air Expeditionary Force concept, the wing had an unprecedented six overseas contingency deployments to patrol the No-Fly Zone over Iraq in Operations Northern and Southern Watch. Two of the six contingency deployments occurred within a ten-month period, attesting to the unit's professionalism and high state of readiness.

==== Modern era ====
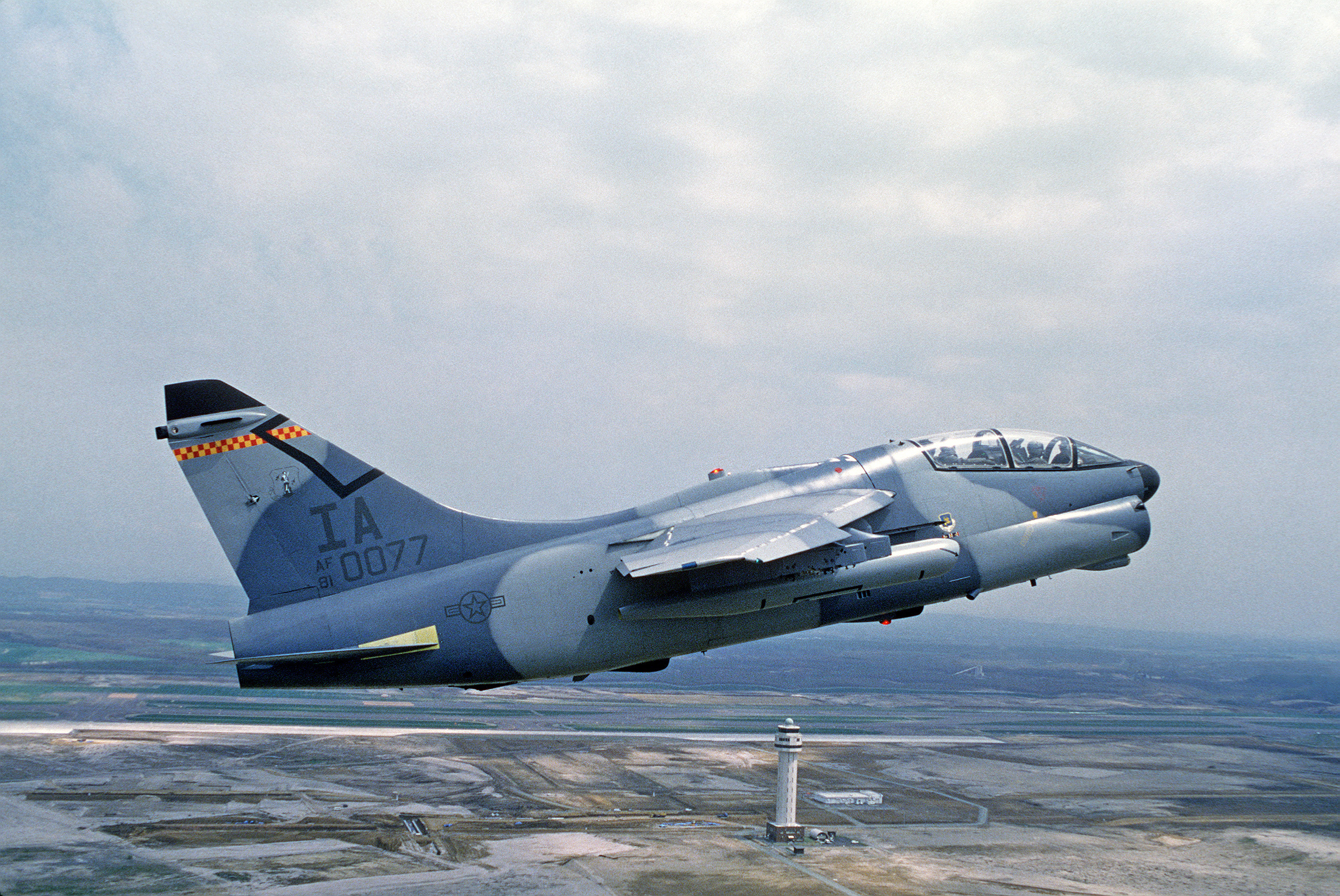
124th TFS Ling-Temco-Vought A-7K Corsair II, AF Ser. No. 81-0077, about 1987

Immediately following the events of 11 September 2001, the 124th Fighter Squadron's F-16s, pilots, and maintenance members were placed on alert, poised to defend against any possible attacks. After 9/11 the unit's F-16's were prepared to launch within minutes in the event of a "scramble" order – 24/7. The unit has also provided continuous Combat Air Patrols during Presidential visits.

The unit was deployed to Al Udeid AB, Qatar in 2005 in support of Operation Enduring Freedom and Operation Iraqi Freedom. Total flying hours during this contingency equaled to over three-fourths of a year's normal flying allocation in only 52 days.

Less than a week after Hurricane Katrina, 12 members of the 132nd Medical Group teamed up with 19 members of the Sioux City 185th Air Refueling Wing and headed south to bring aid to those injured or sick because of the storm. The team treated 80 to 100 patients a day with ailments ranging from minor cuts to dehydration and acute skin infections caused by exposure to bacteria-laden sewer water.

==== Mission Change ====
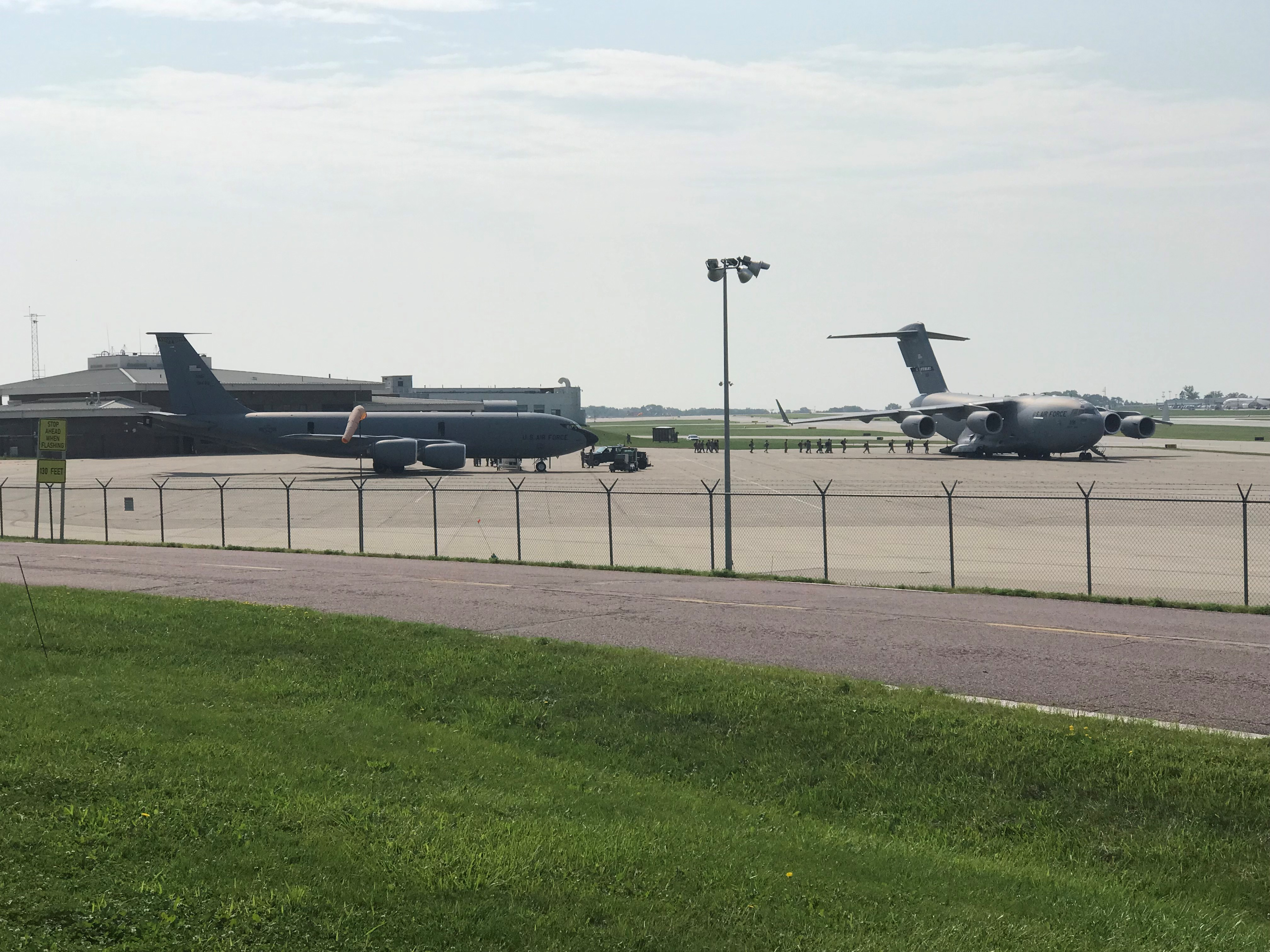
Airmen of the Iowa Air National Guard's 132nd Wing board a C-17 Globemaster III as part of contingency operation in the summer of 2021.

Congressional actions removed the wing's fighters from the base, with the transition beginning in FY 2013. The last regularly scheduled F-16 flights occurred in August 2013, after which the unit's 21 F-16s were transferred to the New Jersey Air National Guard's 177th Fighter Wing at Atlantic City Air National Guard Base.

It was initially suggested to transition the wing to the A-10 Thunderbolt II however in light of the increased need for cyber warfare, intelligence, and RPA capacity by the U.S. Air Force as well as highly technical skills and training that went with this mission the Iowa legislature lobbied successfully for the 132nd to reclassify into the ISR and RPA mission.

The loss of the Falcons created some debate over the base's status as an aeronautical base with a true flying mission, and the airport threatened legal action to begin charging a full market-value lease. This was addressed by the reassignment of UH-60 Blackhawk helicopters from Company C, 2nd Battalion, 147th Aviation, Iowa Army National Guard, from Boone, IA to the base, occupying the hangars that held fixed-wing Air Force fighters for 70 years.

==== Current Missions ====
The wing moved from a manned fighter wing to a multi-mission unit, including the operation of Remotely Piloted Aircraft, an ISR group, and a cyber operations squadron, adding them to the unit's distributed training operations center.

The 132nd Operations Group operates the MQ-9 Reaper, a remotely piloted aircraft. Aircrew based and physically located in Des Moines carry out missions in all corners of the world. These aircrews provide real-time full-motion video and flexible strike capabilities to combatant commanders around the globe.

The 132nd ISR Group provides intelligence, surveillance and reconnaissance research and analysis capabilities to enable combatant commanders' planning and operational decision making. Through the use of intelligence information and training, the analysts of this group determine the strengths and weaknesses of an enemy target complex and pass that information off to Weaponeers who determine the best aim point and weapon to achieve the desired target destruction. As part of the 25th Air Force, the 132 ISRG received the Air Force Meritorious Unit Award in late 2017, 2018, and 2020 for participation in targeting operations worldwide.

The 168th Cyberspace Operations Squadron is tasked with analyzing and protecting networks and systems by determining vulnerabilities and implementing solutions.

The Distributed Training Operations Center (DTOC) is the Iowa Air National Guard center for Distributed Mission Operations (located in Des Moines). It operates as a wing detachment. Distributed Mission Operations (DMO) is a component of the Air Force Training Transformation initiative. While the center organizes DMO events primarily for Air National Guard and Air Force Reserve Command pilots, DTOC also facilitates training between Air National Guard fighter pilots and warfighters in the U.S. Army, Air Force Reserve, Navy, and allied forces. The center also has the capability to include non-virtual assets into the simulation, allowing pilots in physical aircraft to participate in the exercises. Such virtual training exercises save the Air Force substantial funds over gathering assets for real-life exercises.

== Lineage ==
132nd Air Defense Wing

- Established as the 132nd Fighter Group in 1950 and alotted to the National Guard

Activated and federally recognized on 1 November 1950
Ordered into active service on 1 April 1951
Redesignated 132nd Fighter-Bomber Wing on 1 June 1951
Inactivated on 1 January 1953 and returned to state control
Activated on 1 January 1953
Redesignated 132nd Fighter-Interceptor Wing on 1 July 1955
Redesignated 132nd Air Defense Wing on 15 April 1956
Inactivated on 31 July 1969
Consolidated with the 132nd Tactical Fighter Wing on 18 August 1987

132nd Wing

- Established as the 132nd Tactical Fighter Group on 1 May 1969

Activated on 1 August 1969
Consolidated with the 132nd Air Defense Wing on 18 August 1987
Redesignated 132nd Fighter Wing on 15 Mar 1992
Redesignated 132nd Wing on 7 Mar 2015

=== Assignments ===
- Iowa Air National Guard, 1 November 1950
- Strategic Air Command, 1 April 1951
- Tactical Air Command, 1 November 1951
- Iowa Air National Guard, 1 January 1953

Gained by: Air Defense Command
Gained by: Tactical Air Command, 2 August 1969
Gained by: Air Combat Command, 1 June 1992

=== Components ===
- 132nd Fighter Group (later 132nd Fighter-Bomber Group, 132nd Fighter-Interceptor Group, 132nd Fighter Group, 132nd Operations Group, 1 November 1950 – 1 January 1953, 1 January 1953 – 9 December 1974, 15 March 1992 – present
- 124th Tactical Fighter Squadron (later 124th Fighter Squadron) 9 December 1974 – 15 March 1992

=== Stations ===
- Des Moines Municipal Airport, Iowa, 1 November 1950
- Dow Air Force Base, Maine, 15 April 1951
- Alexandria Air Force Base, Louisiana, 5 November 1952 – 1 January 1953
- Des Moines Municipal Airport (later Des Moines Air National Guard Base), Iowa, 21 January 1953 – present

=== Aircraft ===
- F-84B Thunderjet, 1950–1951
- F-51D Mustang, 1950–1953
- F-80C Shooting Star, 1953–1956
- F-84E Thunderjet, 1956–1958
- F-86L Sabre Interceptor, 1958–1962
- F-89J Scorpion, 1962–1969
- F-84F Thunderstreak, 1969–1971
- F-100 Super Sabre, 1971–1977
- A-7D Corsair II, 1977–1992
- F-16 Fighting Falcon, 1992–2013
- MQ-9 Reaper, 2013–present

=== Commanders ===
Name	Dates	Notable Events
Anthony "Cage" Bradley	2026–Present	
Travis “Lloyd” Crawmer	2021–2026	
Mark "Mags" Chidley	2018–2021	First Non-Pilot Wing Commander
Shawn "TWS" Ford	2015–2018	
Kevin "Hook" Heer	2014–2015	
William "Toto" DeHaes	2010–2014	End of Manned Flight Ops
Mark "Eddie" Hammond	2007–2010	
Gregory "Koa" Schwab	2002–2007	
Douglas "Arrow" Pierce	1999–2002	
Joseph "Luken" Lucas	1997–1999	
Donald "Stone" Armington	1990–1997	Transition from A-7 to F-16
Gerald "Grubby" Schwartzbaugh	1987–1990	
Dudley “Smitty” Smidt	1983–1987	
Paul Thompson	1979–1983	
Roger Gilbert	1957–1979	Transition from F-100 to A-7
Frank Berlin	1953–1957	
Reginald Vance	1952	
John Holmes	1950–1952	
