= 132nd Motorized Infantry Brigade =

Brigade of the People's Liberation Army

132nd Division (1948-53) 132nd Infantry Division (1953-60) 132nd Army Division (1960-85) 132nd Infantry Division (1985-2003) 132nd Motorized Infantry Brigade (2003-17) 132nd Light Combined Arms Brigade (2017-)
- Active: 1948.11 -
- Country: People's Republic of China
- Type: Combined Arms
- Size: Brigade
- Part of: 74th Group Army
- Garrison/HQ: Wuzhishan City, Hainan
- Engagements: Chinese Civil War

The 132nd Division (Chinese: 第132师) was created in November 1948 under the Regulation of the Redesignations of All Organizations and Units of the Army, issued by Central Military Commission on November 1, 1948, basing on the 21st Division, 7th Column of the PLA Northeastern Field Army. Its history can be traced to Independent Division of Western Manchurian Military District formed in March 1947, which was formed from 1st and 2nd Special Troops Regiment of 3rd division, New Fourth Army.

The division is part of 44th Corps. Under the flag of 132nd division it took part in several major battles during the Chinese Civil War. The division was composed of 394th, 395th and 396th Regiments.

In October 1952 the division was transferred to 43rd Corps following 44th's disbandment. At the same time 385th Regiment from disbanding 129th Division was transferred to the division and renamed as 396th Regiment. The former 396th was disbanded. In November 1952 it moved onto Hainan island.

In 1953 it renamed as the 132nd Infantry Division (Chinese: 步兵第132师). In April 1960 the division was renamed as the 132nd Army Division (Chinese: 陆军第132师).

In August 1961 the division was transferred to Hainan Provincial Military District's control following 43rd Corps' inactivation. By then the division was composed of:

- 394th Infantry Regiment;
- 395th Infantry Regiment;
- 396th Infantry Regiment;
- 509th Artillery Regiment.

In June 1969 its 509th Artillery Regiment was renamed as Artillery Regiment, 132nd Army Division.

In 1985 the division was renamed as the 132nd Infantry Division (Chinese: 步兵第132师). From 1985 to 1998 the division maintained as a Southern Infantry Division, Catalogue B.

In 1998 the division started to convert to a Motorized Infantry Division: 396th Infantry Regiment converted to Armored Regiment, and Antiaircraft Regiment activated.

In 2003 the division was reduced to brigade-size, and renamed as the 132nd Motorized Infantry Brigade (Chinese: 摩托化步兵第132旅).

In 2017 the brigade was reorganized as the 132nd Light Combined Arms Brigade (Chinese: 轻型合成第132旅).

Now the brigade is the major PLA ground mobile asset in Hainan province.
