= Iowa Air National Guard =

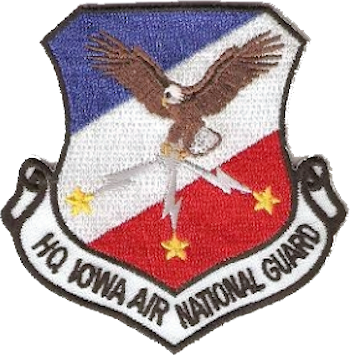
- Shield of the Iowa Air National Guard
- Active: 23 August 1946 - present
- Country: United States
- Allegiance: Iowa
- Branch: Air National Guard
- Type: State militia, military reserve force
- Role: "To meet state and federal mission responsibilities."
- Part of: Iowa National Guard<tybr>United States National Guard Bureau
- Garrison/HQ: Iowa Air National Guard, 7105 NW 70th Avenue, Johnston, Iowa, 50131

Commanders
- Civilian leadership: President Donald Trump (Commander-in-Chief); Troy Meink (Secretary of the Air Force); Governor Kim Reynolds (Governor of the State of Iowa)
- State military leadership: Major General Stephen E. Osborne (Adjutant General); Brigadier General Mark A. Muckey (Assistant Adjutant, Air)

Aircraft flown
- Fighter: MQ-9 Reaper
- Tanker: KC-135R Stratotanker

The Iowa Air National Guard (IA ANG) is the aerial militia of the State of Iowa, United States of America. It is a reserve of the United States Air Force and along with the Iowa Army National Guard, an element of the Iowa National Guard.

As state militia units, the units in the Iowa Air National Guard are not in the normal United States Air Force chain of command. They are under the jurisdiction of the governor of Iowa through the office of the Iowa Adjutant General unless they are federalized by order of the president of the United States. The Iowa Air National Guard is headquartered at Camp Dodge, Johnston, and its commander is currently Brigadier General Shawn Ford.

== Overview ==
Under the "Total Force" concept, Iowa Air National Guard units are considered to be Air Reserve Components (ARC) of the United States Air Force (USAF). Iowa ANG units are trained and equipped by the Air Force and are operationally gained by a major command of the USAF if federalized. In addition, the Iowa Air National Guard forces are assigned to Air Expeditionary Forces and are subject to deployment tasking orders along with their active duty and Air Force Reserve counterparts in their assigned cycle deployment window.

Along with their federal reserve obligations, as state militia units the elements of the Iowa ANG are subject to being activated by order of the governor to provide protection of life and property, and preserve peace, order and public safety. State missions include disaster relief in times of earthquakes, hurricanes, floods and forest fires, search and rescue, protection of vital public services, and support to civil defense.

== Components ==
The Iowa Air National Guard consists of the following major units:

- 132nd Wing

Established 25 February 1941 (as: 124th Observation Squadron); operates: MQ-9 Reaper
Stationed at: Des Moines Air National Guard Base
Gained by: Air Combat Command
The 132d Wing's operational mission is to deploy worldwide and execute directed tactical fighter sorties to destroy enemy forces, supplies, equipment, communications systems and installations with conventional weapons.

- 185th Air Refueling Wing

Established 23 August 1946 (as: 174th Fighter Squadron); operates: KC-135R Stratotanker
Stationed at: Sioux City Air National Guard Base, Sergeant Bluff
Gained by: Air Mobility Command
The mission of the 185 ARW is to provide mid-air refueling and mobility sustainment in direct support of the global mission of the Air Force.

Support Unit Functions and Capabilities:

- 133d Test Squadron

Stationed at Fort Dodge, the 133d provides an effective and sustainable war fighting Command and Control (C2) capability through the professional test and evaluation of the Control and Reporting Center to include the development of future system upgrades and modernization. Announced on May 3, 2024, according to Jackie Schmillen, who is the Director of Public Affairs for the Iowa National Guard, the base in Fort Dodge will be closed in four to six years as part of an Air National Guard restructuring plan.

== History ==
On 24 May 1946, the United States Army Air Forces, in response to dramatic postwar military budget cuts imposed by President Harry S. Truman, allocated inactive unit designations to the National Guard Bureau for the formation of an Air Force National Guard. These unit designations were allotted and transferred to various State National Guard bureaus to provide them unit designations to re-establish them as Air National Guard units.

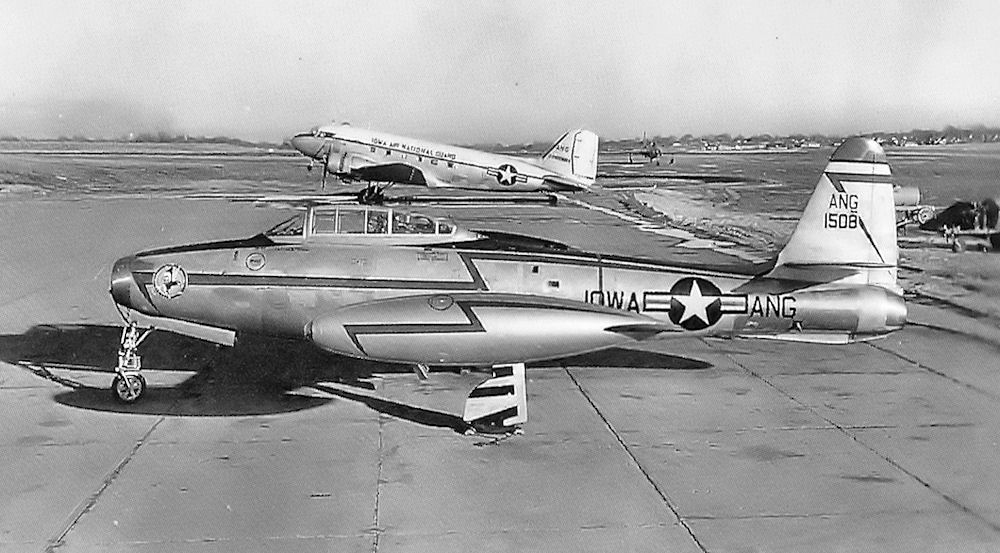
A Republic F-84E Thunderjet of the 124th Fighter Interceptor Squadron at Des Moines Municipal Airport, 1956

The Iowa Air National Guard origins date to the formation of the 132d Fighter Group at Des Moines Municipal Airport, Des Moines, receiving federal recognition on 23 August 1946. It was equipped with F-51D Mustangs and its mission was the air defense of the state. In addition, the 174th Fighter Squadron was formed at Sioux Gateway Airport, Sioux City, receiving federal recognition on 23 August 1946. 18 September 1947, however, is considered the Iowa Air National Guard's official birth concurrent with the establishment of the United States Air Force as a separate branch of the United States military under the National Security Act.

On 1 October 1962 the 174th Tactical Fighter Squadron was expanded to a Group level, and the 185th Tactical Fighter Group received federal recognition and was activated.

Today, the 132d Fighter Wing deploys worldwide and executes directed tactical fighter sorties to destroy enemy forces, supplies, equipment, communications systems and installations with conventional weapons. The 185th Air Refueling Wing provides mid-air refueling and mobility sustainment in direct support of the global mission of the Air Force.

After the September 11th, 2001 terrorist attacks on the United States, elements of every Air National Guard unit in Iowa has been activated in support of the global war on terrorism. Flight crews, aircraft maintenance personnel, communications technicians, air controllers and air security personnel were engaged in Operation Noble Eagle air defense overflights of major United States cities. Also, Iowa ANG units have been deployed overseas as part of Operation Enduring Freedom in Afghanistan and Operation Iraqi Freedom in Iraq as well as other locations as directed.

== See also ==
- Iowa State Guard
- Iowa Wing Civil Air Patrol
