= 132nd Regiment =

132nd Regiment may refer to:

- 132nd (Highland) Regiment of Foot, a disestablished unit of the United Kingdom Army
- 132nd Infantry Regiment (United States), a unit of the United States Army
- 132nd Illinois Volunteer Infantry Regiment, a unit of the Union (North) Army during the American Civil War
- 132nd Indiana Infantry Regiment, a unit of the Union (North) Army during the American Civil War
- 132nd Ohio Infantry, a unit of the Union (North) Army during the American Civil War
- 132nd New York Volunteer Infantry Regiment, a unit of the Union (North) Army during the American Civil War
- 132nd Pennsylvania Infantry, a unit of the Union (North) Army during the American Civil War
