= Des Moines International Airport =

Airport in Des Moines, Iowa, United States

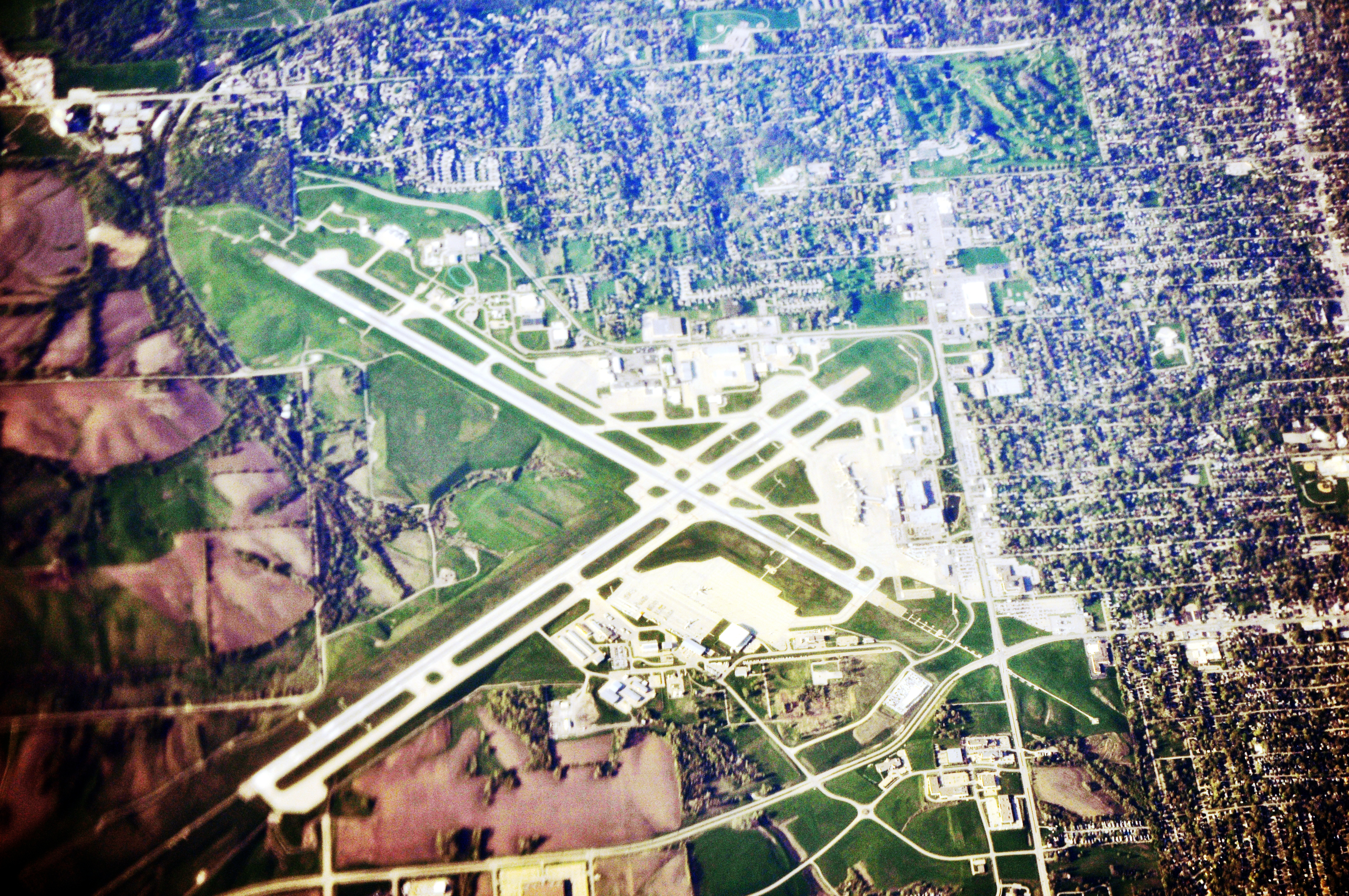
- Aerial view of the airport in 2012
- IATA: DSM; ICAO: KDSM; FAA LID: DSM

Summary
- Airport type: Public
- Owner: City of Des Moines
- Operator: Des Moines Airport Authority
- Serves: Des Moines metropolitan area
- Location: Des Moines, Iowa, U.S.
- Operating base for: Allegiant Air
- Elevation AMSL: 958 ft (292 m)
- Coordinates: 41°32′02″N 093°39′47″W
- Website: www.flydsm.com

Maps
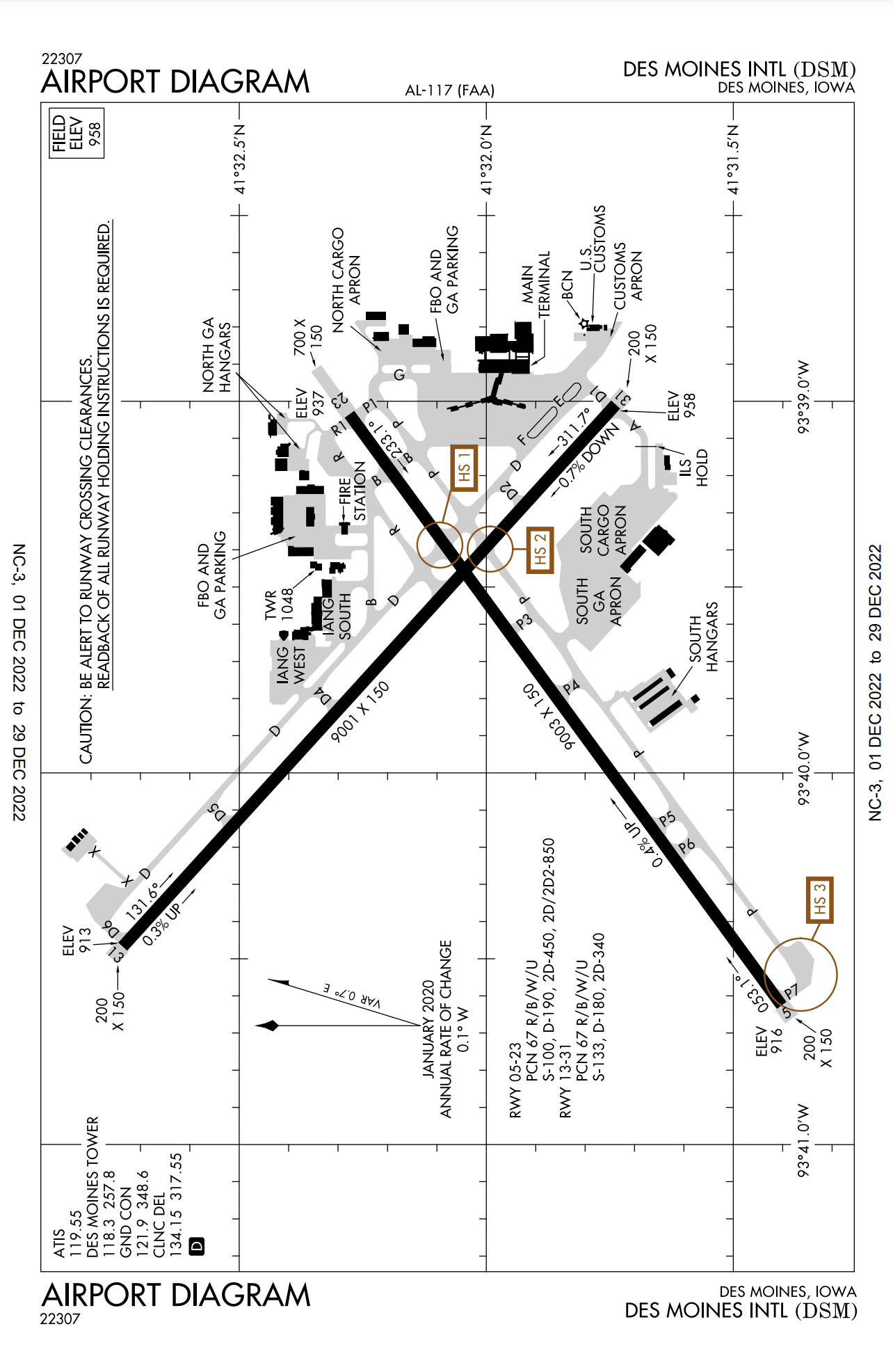
- FAA airport diagram
- Interactive map of Des Moines International Airport

Runways
Direction	Length		Surface
Direction	ft	m	Surface
05/23	9,004	2,744	Concrete
13/31	9,001	2,744	Concrete

Statistics (2025)
- Total passengers: 3,254,107
- Cargo (pounds): 32,319,931
- Airport operations (2024): 88,981
- Source: Federal Aviation Administration, Des Moines International Airport, Business Record

Des Moines International Airport (IATA: DSM, ICAO: KDSM, FAA LID: DSM) is a joint civilian-military commercial service airport 5 miles (8 km) southwest of Des Moines, Iowa, United States.

The airport's 2,600-acre (1,052-hectare) campus includes two runways, 46 buildings, seven parking facilities, and the terminal. Six commercial airlines offer service from DSM (American, Allegiant, Delta, Frontier, Southwest, and United). The airport is managed by the Des Moines Airport Authority.

The National Plan of Integrated Airport Systems for 2017–2021 called it a primary commercial service airport. In 2016 a record 2.48 million passengers used the airport, up 5 percent from 2015. In 2019, DSM served 2.92 million passengers, a record for the airport.

The airport hosts the 132nd Wing of the Iowa Air National Guard.

== History ==
In the 1920s the Des Moines area had several small airports for general aviation and airmail. In 1929, the Iowa General Assembly passed a law allowing cities to sell bonds and levy assessments to build municipal airports. Over 80 sites were considered for the Des Moines Airport until a decision was made to build on 160 acres (0.65 km²) of farmland south of the city. Construction of the airport began in 1932 and was completed in 1933. The airport's first passenger terminal was built shortly after the airport was completed. It was replaced by a new terminal in 1950 that has been expanded and renovated several times. The present concourses were built in 1970, along with the remodeling of the terminal. The airport itself has expanded several times from its original 160-acre (0.65 km^{2}) site and now covers 2,625 acres (10.6 km²).

The airport was originally governed by the City of Des Moines' Parks Department. A separate Aviation Department was established by the city during the 1960s, and in 1982, a separate Aviation Policy Advisory Board was established. The airport was renamed the Des Moines International Airport in 1986 to acknowledge the presence of a United States Customs Service office at the airport.

In 2011, the City of Des Moines transferred control from the city to the Des Moines Airport Authority. The city retains ownership of the land but transfers title to all property and equipment to the public authority. In turn, the authority agreed to a 99-year lease on the land.

In 2016, a record 2.48 million passengers used the airport, up 5 percent from 2015. Federal Aviation Administration records say the airport had 919,990 passenger boardings (enplanements) in calendar year 2008, 853,596 in 2009 and 932,828 in 2011.

In July 2021, the airport announced plans to become a base for Allegiant Air.

== Expansion ==
Interior renovation work began in 2009 on the airport and concluded in 2010. The project, designed by Brooks Borg Skiles AE LLP, included new carpets, paint, gate counters, seating, a new ceiling, signage, and a fire sprinkler system. Also included in the upgrade was a common-use project allowing any airline to use any gate at the airport. A new restroom was also added to the C concourse to allow for future concourse expansion. The airport modernized baggage handling capabilities with expanded processing facilities as well.

In addition to work inside the passenger terminal, the airport was building a rental car facility and new parking facilities.

Throughout 2022 and 2023, major construction at the airport involved the complete reconstruction of runway 05/23, and ongoing (as of September 2023) construction that led 31/13 to be closed as well.

=== Airfield and Terminal Improvements ===
As part of a multi-year expansion project known as "LiftDSM," the airport is undergoing a major reconfiguration of its terminal and airfield to meet passenger growth.

==== New Terminal ====
The airport broke ground on a new, larger terminal in October 2023. The $445 million project is the centerpiece of the LiftDSM initiative and will replace the current 1948-era terminal. The new facility will initially feature 18 gates, increasing the airport's capacity by 50%, and is scheduled to open in 2026.

==== Centralized De-icing Pads ====
In June 2024, the Des Moines Airport Authority awarded a $12.28 million contract for the construction of four new centralized de-icing pads. The pads, which are scheduled for completion in October 2025, will allow aircraft to be de-iced at a dedicated location instead of at the passenger gates. This change is intended to improve operational efficiency and reduce taxiing delays during winter weather. The project also includes the purchase of a snowmelting unit, and the new facility will be operated by Integrated Deicing Systems (IDS).

== Facilities ==
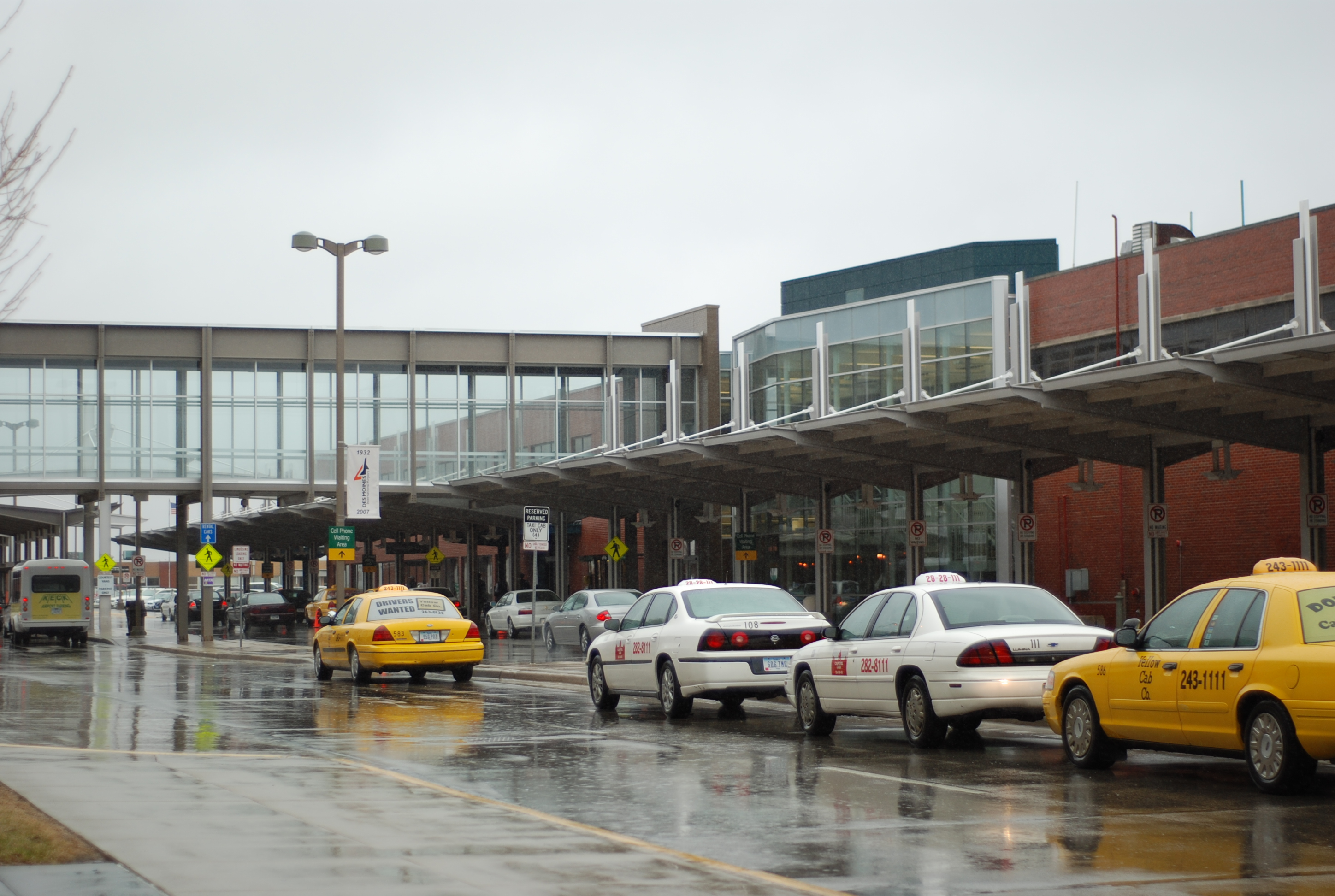
Entrance

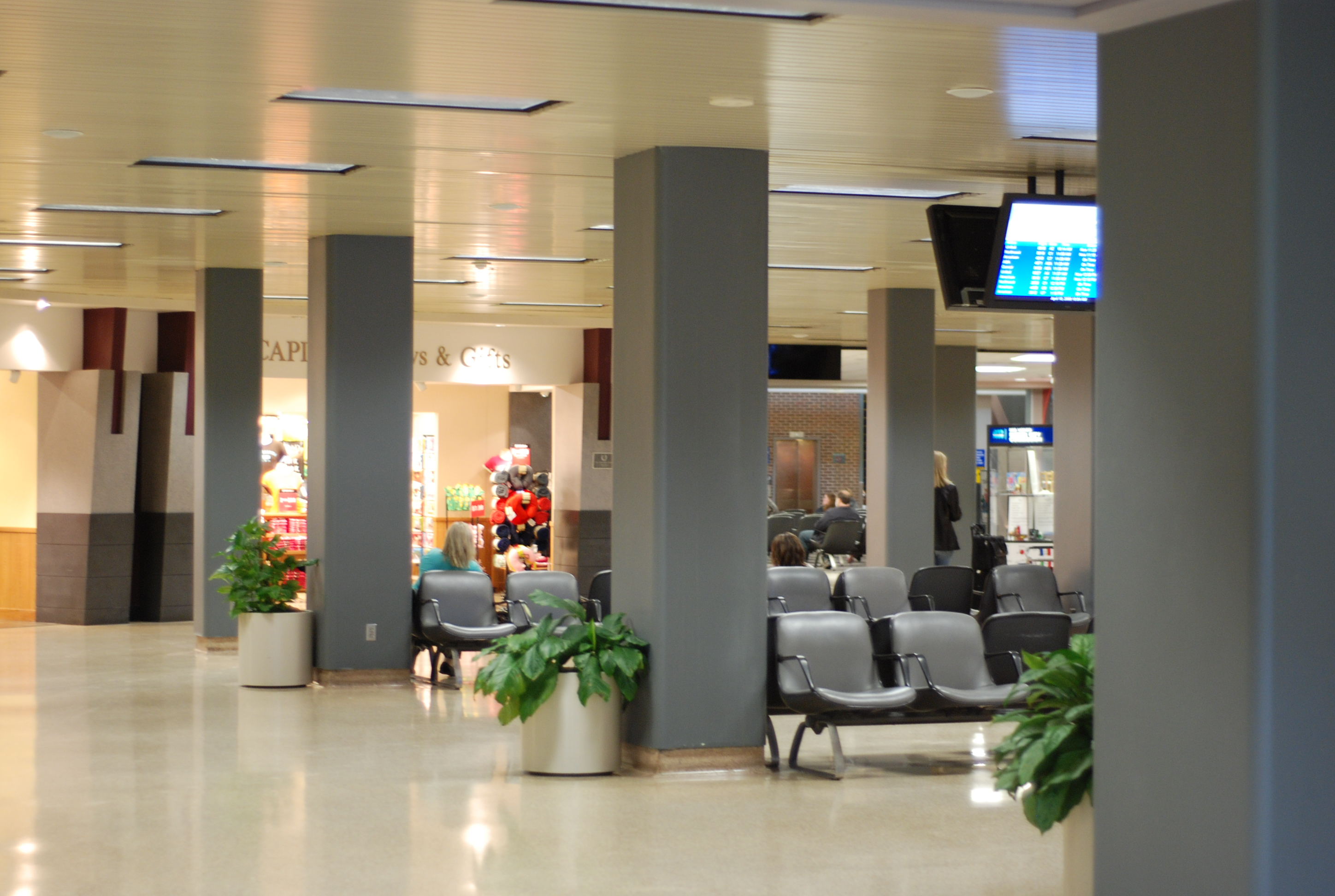
The airport's lobby area in 2008

The airport covers 2,625 acres (1,062 ha) at an elevation of 958 feet (292 m). It has two runways: 5/23 is 9,004 by 150 feet (2,744 x 46 m); 13/31 is 9,001 by 150 feet (2,744 x 46 m).

In the year ending December 31, 2021, the airport had 66,320 aircraft operations, average 182 per day: 44% airline, 9% air taxi, 44% general aviation and 4% military. 105 aircraft were then based at the airport: 63 single-engine, 16 multi-engine, 23 jet, and three helicopter.

The terminal has two concourses; concourse A with gates A1–A5 (used by Allegiant Air, Southwest Airlines, United Airlines, and United Express) and concourse C, with gates C1–C7 (used by American Airlines, American Eagle, Delta Air Lines, Delta Connection, Allegiant Airlines and Frontier Airlines).

Five B-labeled parking spots are used for light aircraft maintenance and temporary parking of airliners. This area is located to the south of the terminal.

The airport is home to a maintenance base for Endeavor Air.

== Airlines and destinations ==
=== Passenger ===
Airlines	Destinations
Alaska Airlines	Seattle/Tacoma (begins June 24, 2027)
Allegiant Air	Austin, Boston, Fort Lauderdale, Fort Myers, Gulf Shores, Las Vegas, Orange County, Orlando/Sanford, Phoenix/Mesa, Punta Gorda (FL), St. Petersburg/Clearwater; Seasonal: Destin/Fort Walton Beach, Nashville, Newark, Sarasota
American Airlines	Charlotte, Dallas/Fort Worth, Phoenix–Sky Harbor; Seasonal: Chicago–O'Hare
American Eagle	Chicago–O'Hare, Dallas/Fort Worth, Los Angeles, New York–LaGuardia, Phoenix–Sky Harbor, Washington–National; Seasonal: Charlotte, Miami, Philadelphia
Delta Air Lines	Atlanta
Delta Connection	Detroit, Minneapolis/St. Paul, New York–LaGuardia
Frontier Airlines	Denver; Seasonal: Orlando, Phoenix–Sky Harbor
Southwest Airlines	Chicago–Midway, Denver, Las Vegas Nashville (begins March 11, 2027); Seasonal: Phoenix–Sky Harbor
United Airlines	Chicago–O'Hare, Denver, Houston–Intercontinental
United Express	Chicago–O'Hare, Denver, Houston–Intercontinental

== Air National Guard ==
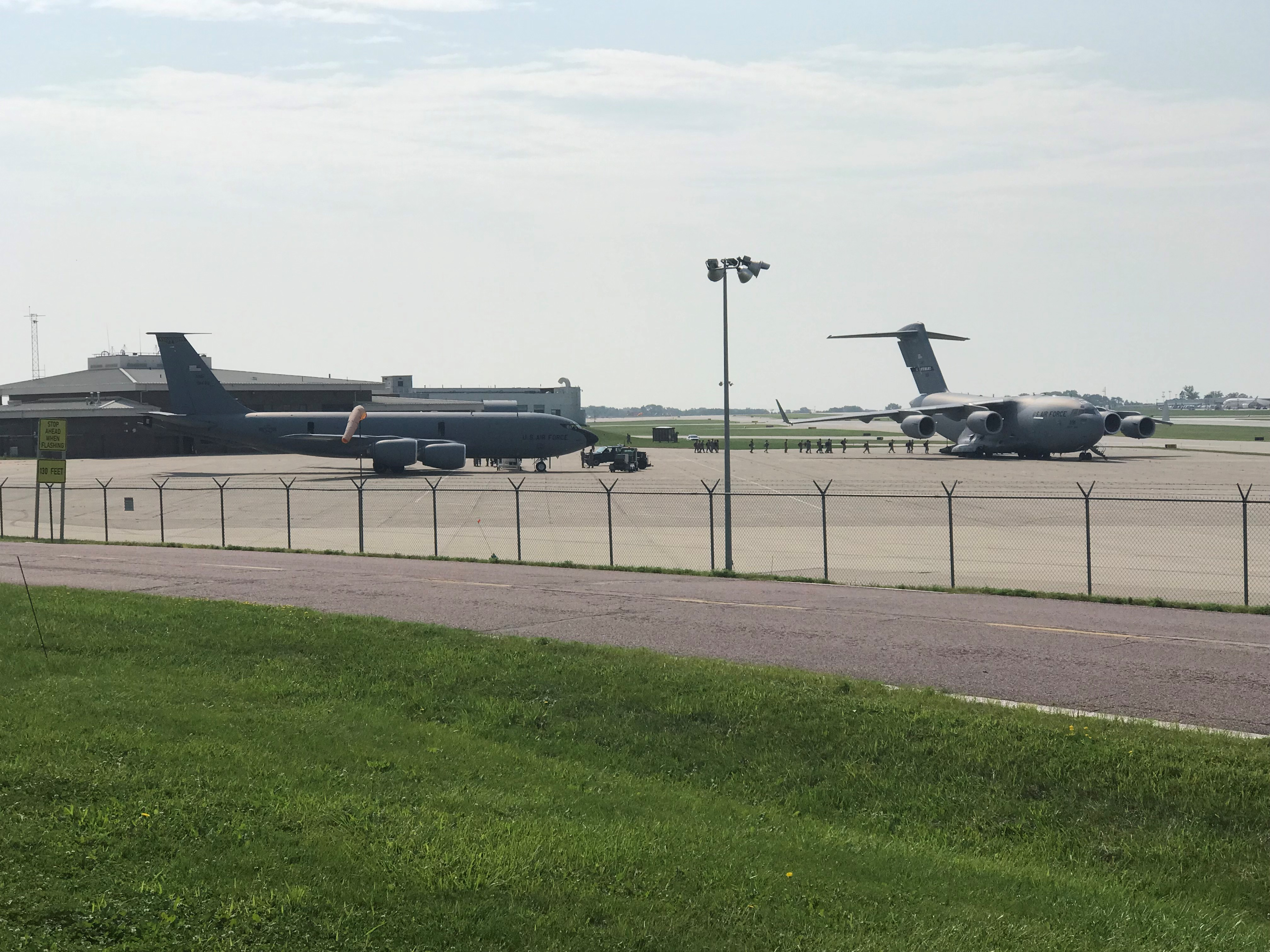
Airmen of the Iowa Air National Guard's 132nd Wing board a New York Air National Guard C-17 Globemaster III as part of contingency operation in the summer of 2021.

The Iowa Air National Guard has occupied an area located at the end of runway 13/31 since the 1960s and has been home to the 132nd Wing.

With the increased need of remotely piloted aircraft, Intelligence, surveillance and reconnaissance (ISR) and cyber warfare in the 21st century the U.S. Air Force transitioned the 132nd from a F-16 Fighting Falcon fighter unit to an ISR and cyber warfare unit starting in 2013. This ended the 132nd's nearly 70-year history as a fighter wing, having previously flown P-51 Mustangs, then F-84 Thunderstreaks, F-100 Super Sabres, and A-7 Corsair IIs, finally transitioning to the F-16 Falcon in the 1980s. Initially it had been considered to transition the wing to the A-10 Thunderbolt II in 2014. However, it was felt by Iowa legislators that the ISR mission would offer more training and skills to the airmen of the 132nd which would be applicable in the 21st century and help boost Iowa's economy. The 132nd's predecessor units participated in air combat during World War II, Desert Storm, and the Iraq War.

These mission changes created some debate over the base's status as a military base, as the Des Moines Airport attempted to void the base's lease and charge "fair market value" for its use, consistent with FAA funding rules at the time. In addition, the removal of the fighters had resulted in the disbanding of the Guard's firefighting unit, forcing the airport to privatize firefighting operations which the base's unit had previously provided. The dispute was addressed in the short term by the reassignment of Black Hawk helicopters from Company C, 2nd Battalion, 147th Aviation Regiment, of the Iowa Army National Guard, from Boone, Iowa, to the base, occupying the hangars that formerly held F-16s. This issue was permanently resolved by President Obama's signature on H.R. 5944, which allowed airports continued access to FAA grant funding by classifying remotely piloted vehicle operations as aeronautical.

With the addition of the Army National Guard unit to the base, a transition to a joint base status has begun. Eventually, Air National Guard operations will occupy the area to the west of the main gate, while Army operations will occupy the east.

== Statistics ==
Busiest domestic destinations from DSM (January 2025 - December 2025)
Rank	Airport	Passengers	Carriers
1	Denver, Colorado	224,800	Frontier, Southwest, United
2	Chicago–O'Hare, Illinois	219,580	American, United
3	Dallas/Fort Worth, Texas	124,370	American
4	(Georgia (U.S. state)) Atlanta, Georgia	112,220	Delta
5	Phoenix–Sky Harbor, Arizona	101,540	American
6	Charlotte, North Carolina	82,230	American
7	Las Vegas, Nevada	81,610	Allegiant, Southwest
8	Minneapolis/St. Paul, Minnesota	74,450	Delta
9	St. Louis, Missouri	69,410	Southwest
10	Detroit, Michigan	57,900	Delta

Largest airlines at DSM (September 2023 – August 2024)
Rank	Airline	Passengers	Share
1	American Airlines	625,000	20.20%
2	Allegiant Air	522,000	16.89%
3	United Airlines	483,000	15.64%
4	Southwest Airlines	415,000	13.43%
5	Endeavor Air	311,000	10.05%
	Other	736,000	23.80%

=== Annual traffic ===
Year	Passenger statistics	Percent change
2013	2,201,388	▲5.8%
2014	2,319,431	▲5.4%
2015	2,365,643	▲2.0%
2016	2,483,924	▲5.0%
2017	2,578,308	▲3.8%
2018	2,773,207	▲7.6%
2019	2,919,904	▲5.3%
2020	1,295,685	▼55.6%
2021	2,167,510	▲67.3%
2022	2,808,125	▲29.6%
2023	3,097,006	▲10.3%
2024	3,176,952	▲2.6%
2025	3,254,107	▲2.4%

== Accidents and incidents ==
- On December 2, 1978, Douglas C-47A N41447 of SMB Stage Line crashed short of the runway while on a cargo flight from Chicago, Illinois. Both occupants survived. Airframe icing was a factor in the accident.
- On November 25, 1985, a Rockwell Aero Commander crashed on approach due to icing and possibly wake turbulence, killing the pilot and six members of the Iowa State University women's cross country team.
- On November 3, 2000, a Luscombe 8A, privately owned and piloted by Lt. Col. Michael O'Grady, Operations Group commander for the 132d Fighter Wing, crashed and was destroyed when during an approach to land on runway 31R, killing the pilot. The NTSB report cited pilot error as the main case of the crash.
- On December 18, 2010, a small red Beechcraft Bonanza crashed while performing an emergency landing at DSM. The Airport Director stated that the small craft had engine problems and turned around for the airport. The aircraft eventually lost the engine and pilot was able to glide to the end of the runway. The aircraft clipped the end of the runway fence with its landing gear, making the nose of the craft dip into the snow. Police and emergency reported only minor injuries.
- On November 29, 2025, Delta Air Lines Flight 5087, operated by an Endeavor Air CRJ-900, skidded off of the runway during a landing. This was due to a winter storm that had passed earlier that day, which made the runway slick. No injuries were reported. As a result of the incident, the airport was closed for 14 hours. Three flights were diverted and many more were cancelled. The NTSB has not released a report on this incident as of writing.

== See also ==
- List of airports in Iowa
- Des Moines Area Regional Transit
