= 119th Fighter Squadron =

New Jersey Air National Guard unit

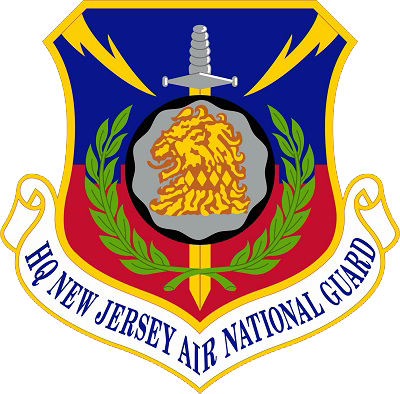
119th Fighter Squadron

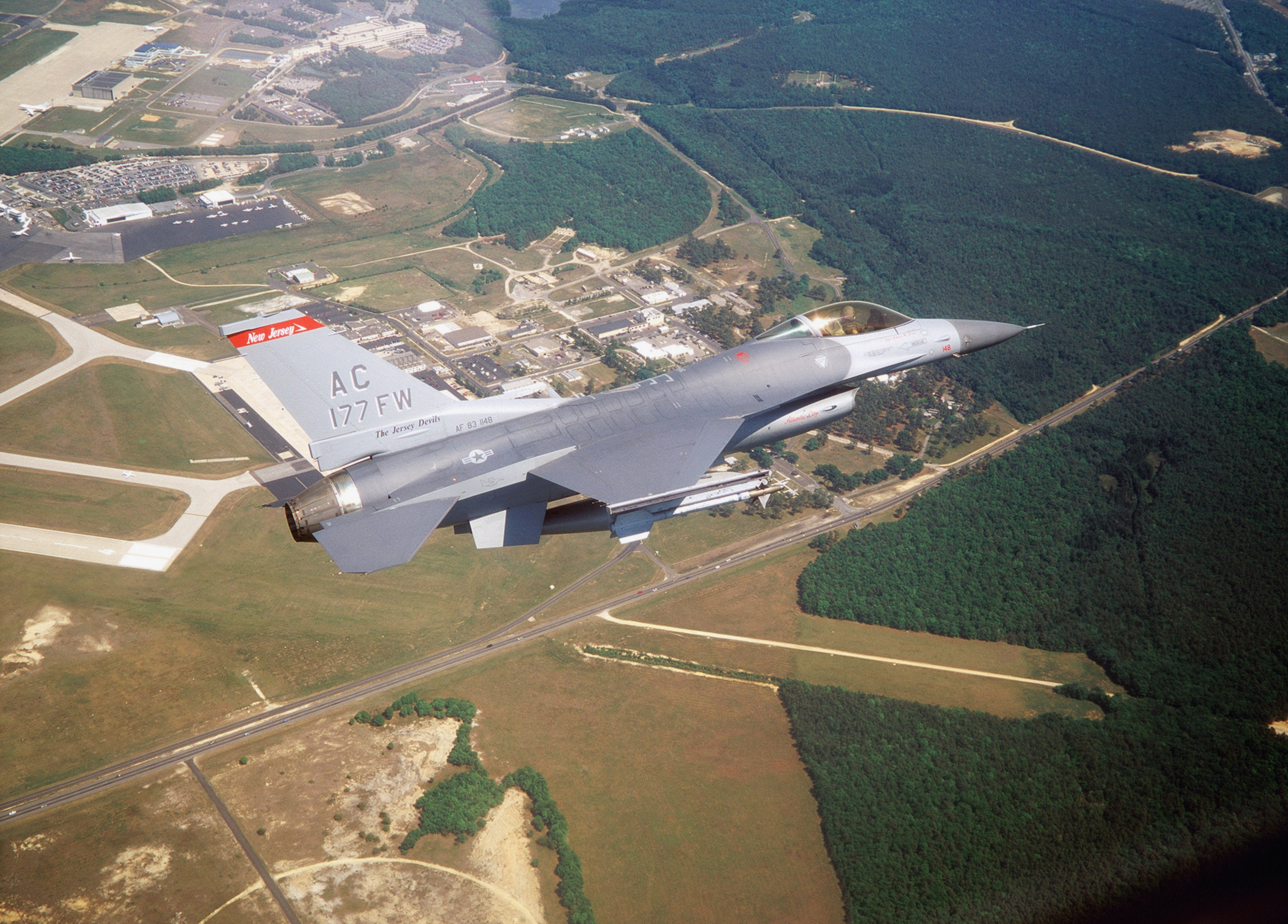
- An F-16 Fighting Falcon of the 119th Fighter Squadron prepares to land at the Atlantic City International Airport.
- Active: 1917–1919; 1923–1942; 1943–1944; 1946–1973; 1973–present
- Country: United States
- Allegiance: New Jersey
- Branch: Air National Guard
- Type: Wing
- Role: Attack
- Part of: New Jersey Air National Guard
- Garrison/HQ: Atlantic City Air National Guard Base, New Jersey

Insignia
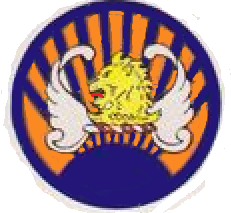
- 119th Observation Squadron emblem (Note: Approved 4 April 1931 for 44th Division Aviation, 7 November 1941 for the squadron).)

- Previous 119th Fighter Squadron emblem, mid-2000s thru 2021
- Tail code: AC
- Tail stripe

The 119th Fighter Squadron is a unit of the New Jersey Air National Guard 177th Fighter Wing located at Atlantic City Air National Guard Base, New Jersey. The 119th is equipped with the F-16 Fighting Falcon aircraft and is the oldest active flying fighter squadron in the Air National Guard.

The squadron is a descendant organization of the World War I 5th Aviation School Squadron (later 119th Aero Squadron), established on 5 June 1917. It was reformed on 30 January 1930, as the 119th Observation Squadron, and is one of the 29 original National Guard Observation Squadrons of the United States Army National Guard formed before World War II.

== History ==
=== Origins ===
The 119th Fighter Squadron is one of the oldest units in the United States Air Force, its origins beginning in June 1917 as the World War I 5th Aviation School Squadron at Langley Field, Virginia. In September 1917 it was redesignated as the 119th Aero Squadron. Not deployed overseas, the unit was inactivated in May 1919.

The squadron was reactivated in 1930 when it was reorganized as the 119th Observation Squadron, New Jersey National Guard, at Metropolitan Airport, Newark, New Jersey as an air arm of the 44th Division Aviation and received federal recognition in January 1930.

In 1934, aircraft of the 119th Observation Squadron were dispatched to the scene of the "Morro Castle", a ship burning off the coast of Asbury Park, New Jersey. Many hours were spent flying over the ship and adjacent water assisting in the direction of rescue efforts and locating survivors.

The 119th Observation Squadron fell victim to the "draft" on 16 September 1940, when it was inducted into active service. The unit continued as the 119th until 12 April 1948, at which time it became the 490th Fighter Squadron. The 490th was disbanded in May 1944 while still at Thomasville, Georgia.

=== New Jersey Air National Guard ===
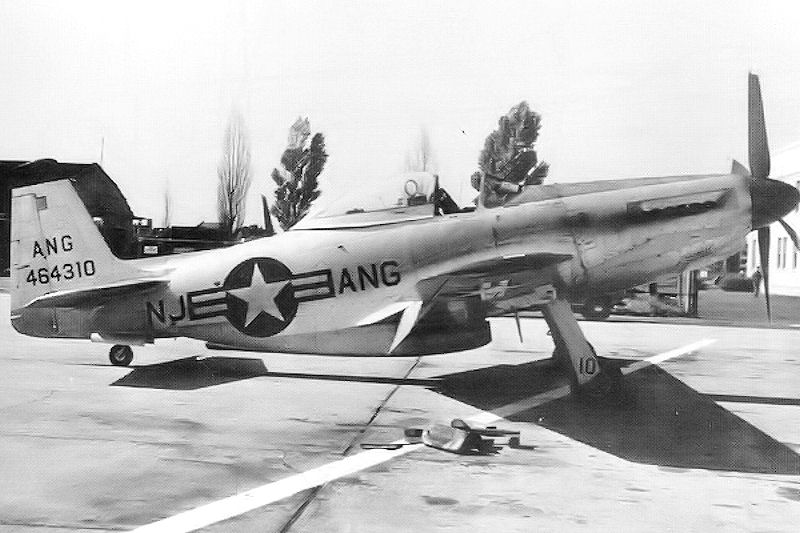
119th Fighter Squadron – North American F-51H-5-NA Mustang 44-64310.

The 490th Fighter Squadron was reconstituted on 21 June 1945. It was then redesignated as the 119th Fighter Squadron, and allotted to the National Guard, on 24 May 1946. It was organized at Newark Airport, New Jersey and was extended federal recognition on 9 June 1947. The squadron was equipped with F-47D Thunderbolts and was allocated to the First Air Force, Continental Air Command.

The 119th moved to the former Atlantic City Naval Air Station, now known as the William J. Hughes Technical Center, on 5 August 1958. This change of station also brought about a change in aircraft to the F-84F. The 119th was called to active duty again in October 1961, for the Berlin Crisis. The unit remained at home station; however, the pilots were periodically rotated to Chaumont Air Base, France.

On 15 October 1962, the 119th was authorized to expand to a group level, and the 177th Tactical Fighter Group was established by the National Guard Bureau. The 119th TFS becoming the group's flying squadron. Other squadrons assigned into the group were the 177th Headquarters, 177th Material Squadron (Maintenance), 177th Combat Support Squadron, and the 177th USAF Dispensary. The 119th transitioned into F-86H aircraft. Two years later, the unit transitioned into F-100 "Super Sabres".

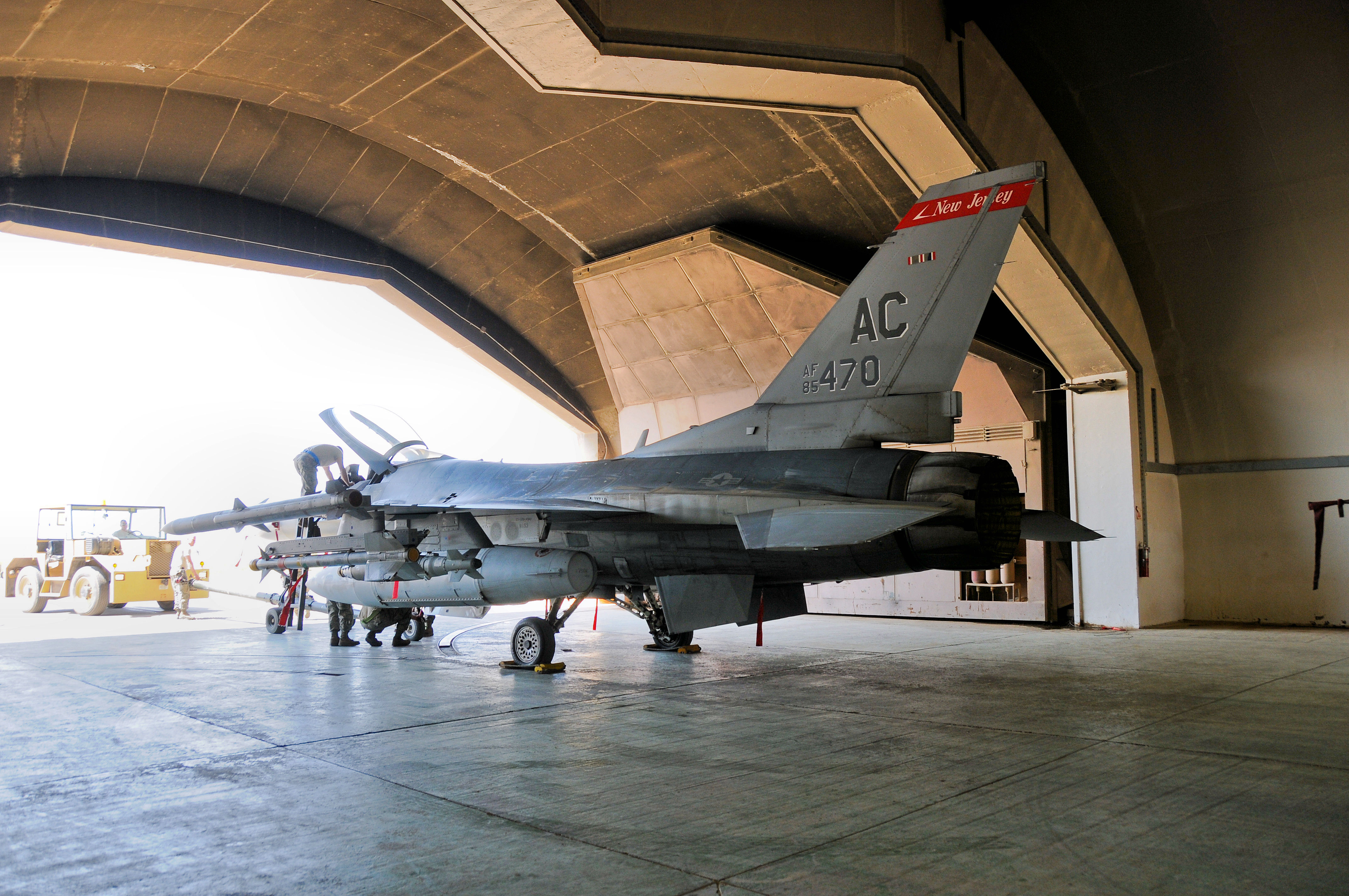
An F-16C Fighting Falcon from the 119th Fighter Squadron in a hardened aircraft shelter at Joint Base Balad, Iraq on 4 May 2010

In January 1968, a new crisis, the seizure of the American ship USS Pueblo by North Korean forces, and again the 119th was called to active duty. In May 1968, the squadron was activated to federal service, and its personnel were assigned to the 113th Tactical Fighter Wing, Myrtle Beach Air Force Base, South Carolina. Personnel were spread throughout the United States, Taiwan, Korea, and Vietnam with the main unit stationed at the 113 TFW. The 119 TFS returned to Atlantic City, New Jersey, in June 1969, and transitioned into the F-105 "Thunderchief" in 1970.

In 1972, Headquarters Air Force announced that the 119th TFS would be assigned to the Aerospace Defense Command and be responsible for protecting the United States from airborne attacks, and so was reorganized as the 177th Fighter Interceptor Group and 119th Fighter Interceptor Squadron. In 1973, the unit transitioned into the F-106 Delta Dart and assumed alert status the following year. The Aerospace Defense Command then came under TAC as the Air Defense Tactical Air Command, and then again changed to a numbered Air Force, 1st Air Force. During 1988, the unit transitioned into the F-16A/B, "Fighting Falcon", and received an "excellent" rating during its first Operational Readiness Inspection with the F-16 in October 1989.

From 1 May through 13 June 1998, the squadron deployed five F-16C Fighting Falcon aircraft and 46 personnel to Howard Air Force Base, Panama, in support of Operation Coronet Nighthawk. 130 personnel rotated on a two-week basis during the six-week deployment. Operating as part of a joint interagency task force, the wing’s role was to detect and identify suspected drug smuggling aircraft. Once identified, the suspected aircraft are turned over to law enforcement agencies for apprehension.

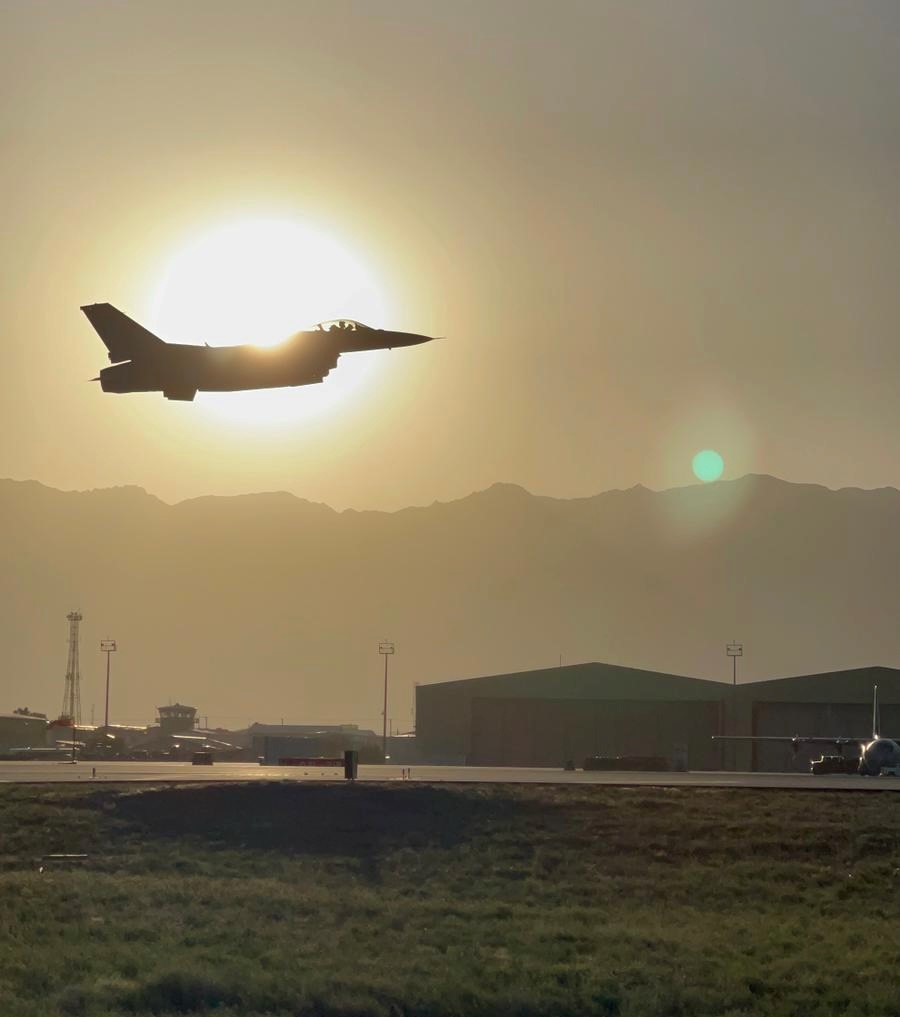
The final fighter aircraft takeoff from Bagram Air Base, 26 May 21, from the 119th Expeditionary Fighter Squadron.

Since October 2001, the unit has had an active involvement in Operation Noble Eagle, Operation Southern Watch, Operation Northern Watch, Operation Enduring Freedom, Operation Iraqi Freedom, Operation Freedom's Sentinel, and Operation Inherent Resolve. During the 119th Expeditionary Fighter Squadron's deployment in 2021 the unit became the last fighter squadron to be stationed in Afghanistan following Operation Enduring Freedom and Freedom's Sentinel. The final F-16 departed Bagram Air Base on 26 May 21.

== Lineage ==
119th Aero Squadron

- Organized as the 5th Aviation School Squadron on 5 June 1917

Redesignated 119th Aero Squadron on 2 September 1917
Redesignated Detachment No. 11, Air Service, Aircraft Production on 31 July 1918
Demobilized on 29 May 1919
Reconstituted on 17 October 1936 and consolidated with the 119th Observation Squadron

119th Fighter Squadron

- Constituted as the 119th Squadron (Observation) in 1921 and allotted to the New Jersey Air National Guard

Redesignated 119th Observation Squadron on 25 January 1923
Activated on 30 January 1930 and federally recognized

- Consolidated with Detachment No. 11, Air Service, Aircraft Production on 17 October 1936

Ordered to active service on 16 September 1940
Redesignated 119th Observation Squadron (Medium) on 13 January 1942
Redesignated 119th Observation Squadron on 4 July 1942
Inactivated on 18 October 1942

- Activated on 1 March 1943

Redesignated 119th Reconnaissance Squadron (Fighter) on 2 April 1943
Redesignated 490th Fighter Squadron, Single Engine on 11 August 1943
Disbanded on 1 May 1944

- Reconstituted on 21 June 1945

Redesignated 119th Fighter Squadron, Single Engine and allotted to the National Guard on 24 May 1946
Activated on 28 December 1946
Extended federal recognition on 9 February 1947
Redesignated 119th Fighter-Bomber Squadron on 16 August 1952
Redesignated 119th Fighter-Interceptor Squadron on 1 July 1955
Redesignated 119th Tactical Fighter Squadron, Day (Special Delivery) on 1 November 1958
Federalized and placed on active duty on 1 October 1961
Released from active duty and returned to New Jersey state control on 1 August 1962
Redesignated 119th Tactical Fighter Squadron on 15 October 1962
Federalized and placed on active duty on 1 April 1968
Released from active duty and returned to New Jersey state control on 27 May 1969
Redesignated 119th Fighter-Interceptor Squadron on 31 October 1972
Redesignated 119th Tactical Fighter Squadron, 8 August 1988
Redesignated 119th Fighter Squadron on 15 March 1992

=== Assignments ===
- Post Headquarters, Langley Field, 5 June 1917 – 29 May 1919
- 44th Division, 1921 – 15 February 1929 (not activated)
- New Jersey National Guard (attached to 44th Division), 30 January 1930
- 42d Observation Group, II Corps, 1 October 1933
- Second Corps Area, 16 September 1940
- First Army, 3 October 1940
- II Army Corps, c. March 1941
- First Army, c. June 1941
- I Air Support Command (attached to 59th Observation Group), 1 September 1941
- 59th Observation Group, 29 March – 18 October 1942
- 59th Observation Group (later 59th Reconnaissance Group), 1 March 1943 – 1 May 1944
- 108th Fighter Group, 28 December 1946
- 102d Fighter Group, c. 1950
- 108th Fighter Group, February 51
- 102d Fighter Group (later 102d Fighter-Interceptor Group), Jun 1951
- 108th Fighter-Bomber Group (later 108th Fighter-Interceptor Group, 108th Fighter Group, 108th Tactical Fighter Group), March 1953
- 108th Tactical Fighter Wing, 1 October 1961 (attached to 7108th Tactical Wing)
- 108th Tactical Fighter Group, 1 August 1962
- 177th Tactical Fighter Group, 15 October 1962
- 113th Tactical Fighter Wing, 26 January 1968
- 177th Tactical Fighter Group (later 177th Fighter-Interceptor Group, 177th Fighter Group), 18 June 1969
- 177th Operations Group, 11 October 1995 – present

=== Stations ===
- Langley Field, Virginia, 5 June 1917 – 29 May 1919
- Newark Airport, New Jersey, 30 June 1930
- Fort Dix Army Air Base, New Jersey, 27 March 1942
- Barnstable Municipal Airport, Massachusetts, 26 August 1942
- Grenier Field, New Hampshire, 10 October 1942
- Birmingham Army Air Field, Alabama, 18 October 1942
- Page Field, Florida, 1 March 1943
- Thomasville Army Air Field, Georgia, 12 April 1943 – 1 May 1944
- Newark Airport, New Jersey, 9 February 1947
- McGuire Air Force Base, New Jersey, 1 February 1956
- Atlantic City Airport, New Jersey, 5 August 1958
- Myrtle Beach Air Force Base, South Carolina, 26 January 1968
- Atlantic City Airport (later Atlantic City Air National Guard Base), New Jersey, 18 June 1969

=== Aircraft ===
- F-16C/D Fighting Falcon (1994 – present)
- F-16A ADF Fighting Falcon (1988–1994)
- F-106A/B Delta Dart (1973–1988)
- F-105B Thunderchief (1970–1973)
- F-100C Super Sabre (1963–1970)
- F-86H Sabre (1962–1963)
- F-84F Thunderstreak (1958–1962)
- F-86E Sabre (1955–1958)
- F-51D Mustang (1947-1952)
- F-51H (1952–1955)
- F-47D (1947–1952)
- Bell P-39 Airacobra (1943–1944)
- PT-1, BT-1, O-2, O-17, O-38, O-46, O-47, O-49, O-52, O-58 (1930–1942)
- Curtiss Jenny JN-4 (1917-1919)

== See also ==
- List of American aero squadrons
- List of observation squadrons of the United States Army National Guard
