= Atlantic City International Airport =

Commercial airport in Atlantic County, New Jersey, United States

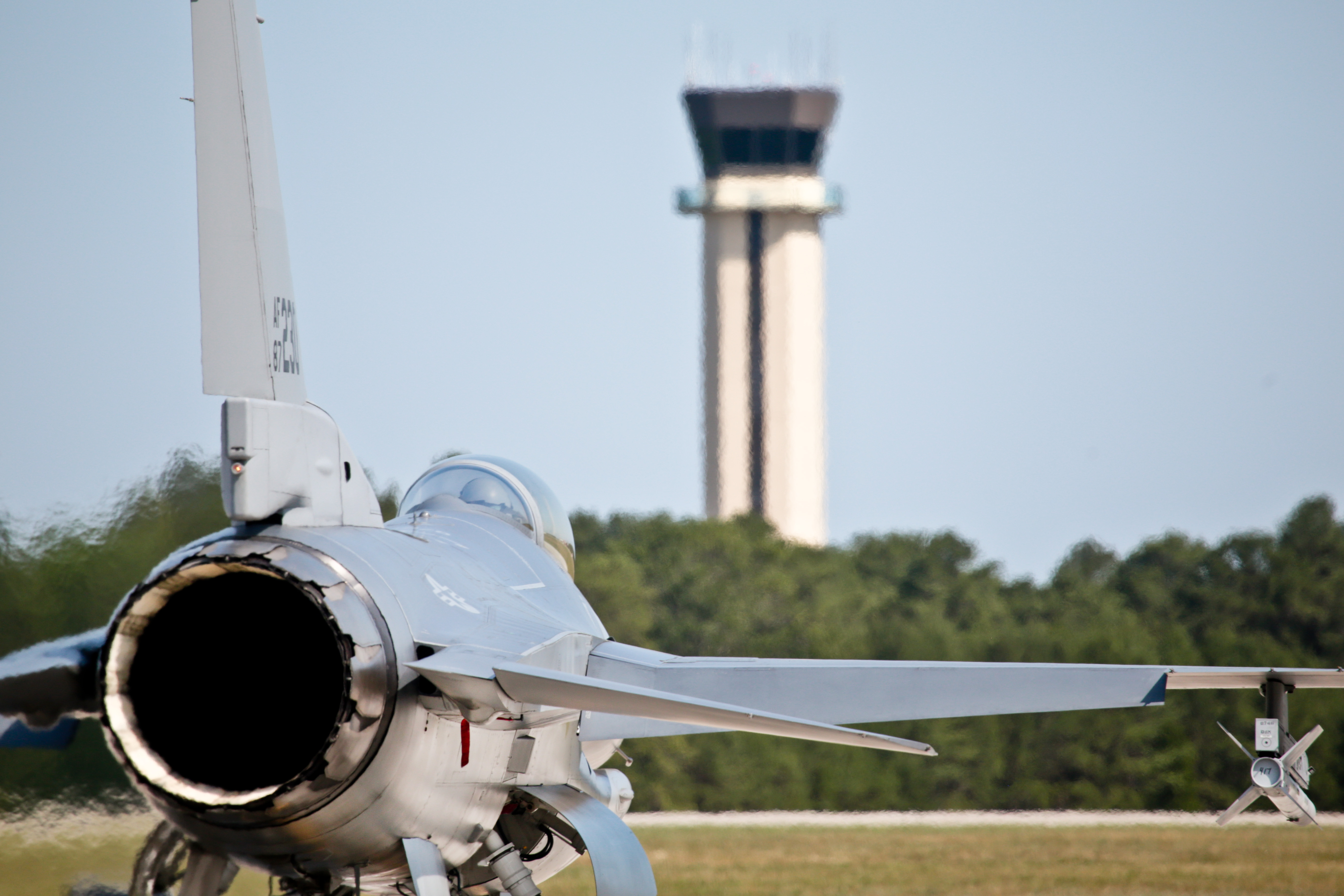
- IATA: ACY; ICAO: KACY; FAA LID: ACY; WMO: 72407

Summary
- Airport type: Public
- Owner: South Jersey Transportation Authority (SJTA)
- Operator: SJTA
- Serves: Atlantic City, New Jersey, U.S.
- Location: Egg Harbor Township, New Jersey, U.S.
- Focus city for: Global Crossing Airlines
- Elevation AMSL: 75 ft (23 m)
- Coordinates: 39°27′27″N 074°34′38″W
- Website: acairport.com

Maps
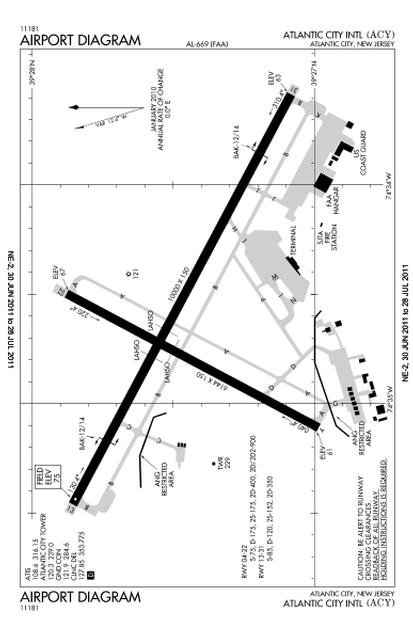
- FAA airport diagram
- Interactive map of Atlantic City International Airport

Runways
Direction	Length		Surface
Direction	ft	m	Surface
04/22	6,145	1,873	Asphalt/concrete
13/31	10,001	3,048	Asphalt

Helipads
Number	Length		Surface
Number	ft	m	Surface
H1	102	31	Asphalt

Statistics (2025)
- Aircraft operations (2024): 56,612
- Based Aircraft (2023): 54
- Total passengers (2025): 845,108
- Source: Federal Aviation Administration

Atlantic City International Airport (IATA: ACY, ICAO: KACY, FAA LID: ACY) is a shared civil-military airport 9 miles (14 km) northwest of central Atlantic City, New Jersey, in Egg Harbor Township, the Pomona section of Galloway Township and in Hamilton Township. The airport is accessible via Exit 9 on the Atlantic City Expressway. The facility is operated by the South Jersey Transportation Authority (SJTA). Most of the land is owned by the Federal Aviation Administration and leased to the SJTA, while the SJTA owns the terminal building.

The facility also is a base for the New Jersey Air National Guard's 177th Fighter Wing operating the F-16C/D Fighting Falcon, and the United States Coast Guard's Coast Guard Air Station Atlantic City operating the Eurocopter HH-65 Dolphin. The airport property includes FAA's William J. Hughes Technical Center, a major research and testing hub for the Federal Aviation Administration and a training center for the Federal Air Marshal Service.

The South Jersey Transportation Authority has outlined plans for massive terminal expansions (on top of current initiatives) which might be needed if more airlines serve the airport. Passenger traffic at the airport in 2011 was 1,404,119, making it the 102nd busiest airport in the country.

== History ==
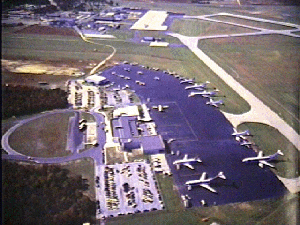
An early photo of the Atlantic City Airport Terminal

In 1942, Naval Air Station Atlantic City was built on 2,444 acres (9.89 km^{2}) of leased private land in Egg Harbor Township, New Jersey. Its purpose was to train various carrier air groups consisting of fighter, bomber and torpedo squadrons.

In August 1943, NAS Atlantic City changed its mission to strictly fighter training, consisting of low and high altitude gunnery tactics, field carrier landing practice (FCLP), carrier qualifications (CQ), bombing, formation tactics, fighter direction, night operations and an associated ground school curriculum.

In 1957, the Navy announced its intention to shut down the $12 million base in July 1960, but even sooner than that, NAS Atlantic City was decommissioned in June 1958 and transferred to the Airways Modernization Board (AMB), later taken over by the FAA. In November 1958 the then-Federal Aviation Agency, now Federal Aviation Administration (FAA), took over operations of the AMB. The lease transferred to the FAA and was sold for $55,000. Atlantic City decided to retain 84 of the 4,312 acres. The FAA expanded the former U.S. Navy land parcel to about 5,000 acres (20 km^{2}) and established the National Aviation Facilities Experimental Center research facility that eventually became the William J. Hughes Technical Center. The South Jersey Transportation Authority (SJTA) initially leased portions of the airport from the FAA and now serves as the airport owner and operator of the facility.

When the Navy departed in 1958, the 119th Fighter Squadron of the New Jersey Air National Guard relocated to Atlantic City from their former base at Newark International Airport with their F-84F Thunderstreak aircraft, establishing an Air National Guard base on the site of the former naval air station. The current 177th Fighter Wing of the New Jersey Air National Guard has been at this location ever since.

During the 1960s and early 1970s, the active duty U.S. Air Force's 95th Fighter Interceptor Squadron, stationed at Dover AFB, Delaware, maintained an Operating Location and Alert Detachment of F-106 Delta Darts at Atlantic City ANGB on 24-hour alert. After the 177th Fighter Wing reequipped with the F-106 in 1973, the 177th took on the air defence alert mission.

In the fall of 1983, American International Airways attempted to operate a small hub at the airport with Douglas DC-9-30 jetliners with passenger service to Boston, Buffalo, Chicago, Cleveland, Detroit, Fort Lauderdale, Miami, Orlando, Pittsburgh, Tampa and West Palm Beach. ACY has also had US Airways jet service to Pittsburgh as well as US Airways Express turboprops to Philadelphia, Baltimore and Washington, and Continental Express turboprops and regional jets to Cleveland Hopkins International Airport. This regional jet service for Continental Airlines was operated by ExpressJet Airlines with Embraer ERJs.

People Express Airlines (PeopleExpress) provided Boeing 737 service from / to EWR (Newark Airport), in the 1980s.

Delta Air Lines also had flights to Boston on Delta Connection regional jets operated by Atlantic Coast Airlines. In addition, Delta Connection via its partner Comair operated flights to Cincinnati and Orlando, which ended on May 1, 2007. WestJet had Boeing 737 jetliner flights from ACY to Toronto, but ended them on May 9, 2010, leaving the airport with no international service. On April 1, 2014, United Airlines started service from Atlantic City to Chicago–O'Hare and Houston, but the service was discontinued on December 3, 2014. Air Canada had seasonal flights to Toronto in the Summer of 2015, but has decided not to return in the Summer of 2016, once again leaving the airport without international scheduled flights.

Work began in August 2011 upgrading the passenger screening facilities at airport. The checkpoint expansion saw three new screening lanes be added, as well as improvements to the airport's infrastructure. The expansion also includes development of a Federal Inspection Services station. Under this project, additional passenger loading bridges and gates were added, technological upgrades & baggage claim improvements were made, additional retail space was added, and improved check-in capabilities were made.

In 2013, a new airport rescue and firefighting station opened at Atlantic City International Airport. The new, 4,500-square-foot (420 m^{2}) building includes emergency vehicle bays, administrative & staff living areas, and enhanced equipment & apparatus facilities – in addition to space for training requirements.

In 2022, American Airlines started scheduled service from the airport to their airplanes at Philadelphia International Airport using buses in lieu of planes; the service is ticketed & operated as an airline flight but utilizes buses. This airside-to-airside service, which is solely for screened passengers who booked a seat on the route, is operated by American's bus service partner, Landline, on the airline's behalf.

In May 2023, Atlantic City International Airport was to receive service from a new carrier, Sun Country Airlines. Sun Country was to fly from its hub at Minneapolis - St Paul International Airport (MSP) to ACY biweekly, deploying its 737-800s on the route. However, the start of the service was delayed.

In April 2024, Spirit Airlines announced that it would be closing its crew base at the Atlantic City Airport.

In August 2025, Allegiant Air announced it would begin operations out of Atlantic City Airport in December 2025. It added four new routes to Florida, including Fort Lauderdale, St. Petersburg, Sanford, and Punta Gorda.

In May 2026, Breeze Airways announced its expansion into the airport, taking over multiple routes previously served by Spirit Airlines, which had ended its operations at the start of that month, as well as more directly competing against Allegiant's new roundtrip routes from the area to the Carolinas and Florida that had been launched the previous year.

Near the end of June 2026, Breeze expanded its initial flight offerings from the airport to include Vero Beach, Florida, further replacing the routes abandoned by Spirit.

== Facilities ==
Atlantic City International Airport covers 5,000 acres (2,000 ha) at an elevation of 75 feet (23 m) above mean sea level. It has two runways and one helipad: 4/22 is 6,145 by 150 feet (1,873 x 46 m) asphalt/concrete; 13/31 is 10,001 by 150 feet (3,048 x 46 m) asphalt; Helipad H1 is 102 x 102 feet (31 x 31 m) asphalt.

=== Terminal ===
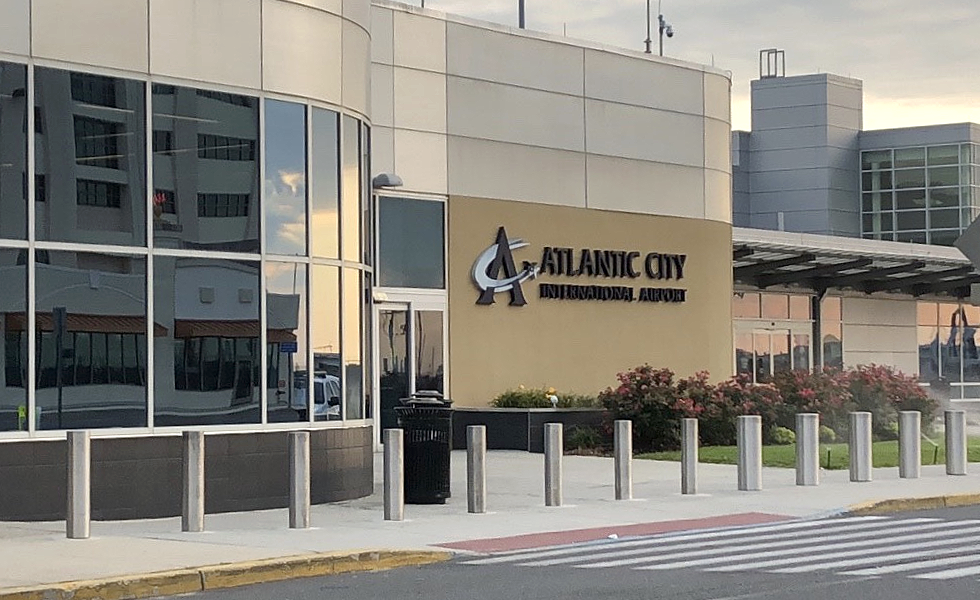
The entrance to the passenger terminal at Atlantic City International Airport.

Atlantic City International Airport has one terminal. Several charter carriers operate out of the terminal, along with scheduled passenger flights. The terminal has a small layout, making it an alternative to Philadelphia International Airport or Newark Liberty International Airport.

Passengers enter the terminal on the lower level, which has the check-in counters, a restaurant and gift shop, and the TSA security checkpoint. The baggage claim area is on this level, with three carousels. After the security checkpoint, stairs and escalators lead to the departures level and its ten gates, along with airside shops and restaurants.

Free Wi-Fi is available throughout the terminal.

=== Car parking ===
Atlantic City International Airport has a six-story parking garage with a covered walkway within steps to the terminal building. Surface parking is within walking distance and shuttle service is provided from the economy parking area to the terminal building.

=== Federal facilities ===
The Federal Aviation Administration William J. Hughes Technical Center is on the property of Atlantic City Airport.

==== Atlantic City Air National Guard Base ====

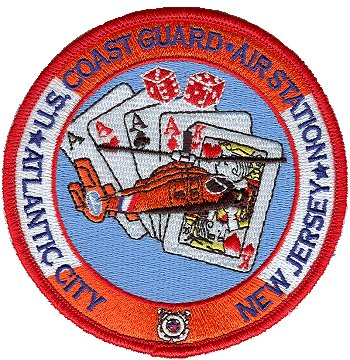

Since 1958, the airport has been home to Atlantic City Air National Guard Base and the 177th Fighter Wing (177 FW), an Air Combat Command (ACC)-gained unit of the New Jersey Air National Guard, operating the F-16C/D Fighting Falcon. Since October 1998, the wing has had an active involvement in Operation Noble Eagle, Operation Southern Watch, Operation Northern Watch, Operation Enduring Freedom and Operation Iraqi Freedom. As an Air National Guard unit, the 177 FW has dual federal (USAF augmentation) and state (support to New Jersey) missions.

==== Coast Guard Air Station Atlantic City ====
ACY is also home to Coast Guard Air Station Atlantic City. CGAS Atlantic City was opened on May 18, 1998, and is the newest and largest single airframe unit and facility of the Coast Guard's air stations. It is a product of the merging of the former CGAS Brooklyn/Floyd Bennett Field, NY and Group Air Station Cape May, NJ into one unit.

CGAS Atlantic City consists of 10 HH-65C Dolphin helicopters and it maintains two Dolphin helicopters in 30-minute response status. Approximately, 250 aviation personnel comprise the facility's full-time staff, augmented by additional part-time Coast Guard Reserve and Coast Guard Auxiliary personnel.

CGAS Atlantic City also provides aircrews and aircraft to the Washington, D.C., area as part of Operation Noble Eagle, the Department of Defense USNORTHCOM / NORAD mission to protect U.S. airspace and, in this case, specifically around the nation's capital.

== Access ==
Taxi service is available at curbside and a shuttle service is provided by the Atlantic City Jitney Association, located in the airport terminal, outside of baggage claim. A shuttle bus brings passengers to the Egg Harbor City rail station, which provides service to the Atlantic City Line, which runs between the 30th Street Station in Philadelphia to the Atlantic City Rail Terminal. Shuttles to the Egg Harbor rail station connect to shuttles to the visitor center at the FAA Technical Center and Stockton University, as well as bus lines to the PATCO Speedline at Lindenwold station. The nearest highway is the Atlantic City Expressway, which has an exit for County Route 563 (Tilton Road) and Delilah Road, which runs to a traffic circle with Amelia Earhart Boulevard, which leads directly to the airport.

== Airlines and destinations ==
=== Passenger ===
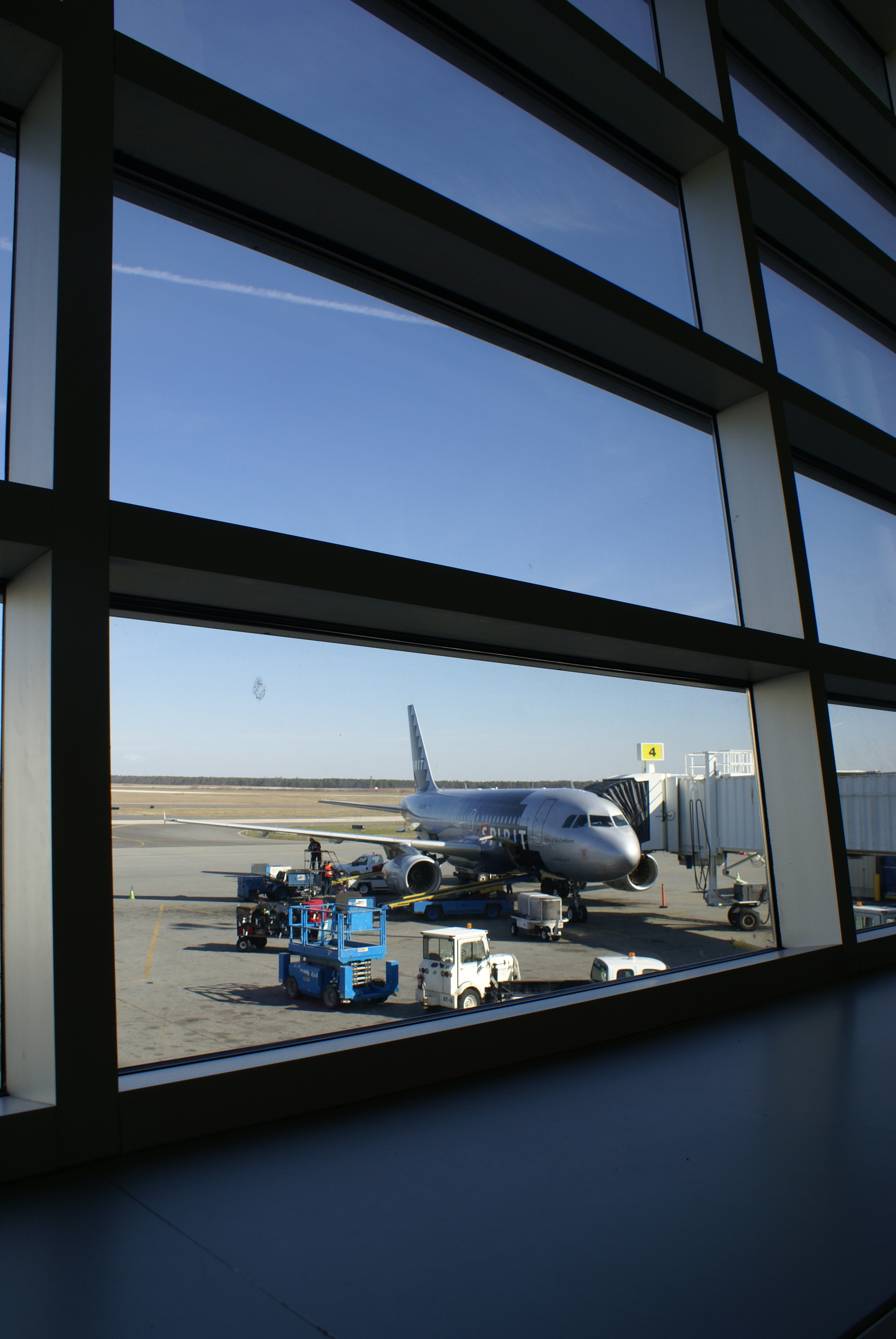
A Spirit Airlines aircraft at Atlantic City International Airport in 2007

Airlines	Destinations
Allegiant Air	Fort Lauderdale, Myrtle Beach, Orlando/Sanford, Punta Gorda (FL), St. Petersburg/Clearwater
Breeze Airways	Charleston (SC), Fort Myers, Myrtle Beach, Orlando, Raleigh/Durham, Tampa, Vero Beach, West Palm Beach (begins December 17, 2026)

Destinations map
Destinations from Atlantic City International Airport
Red = Year-round destination
Blue = Future destination
Green = Seasonal destination
Pink = Destination being terminated

== Bus service ==
=== Tarmac-to-tarmac shuttle ===
Operator	Destination	Notes	Refs
American Airlines (operated by Landline)	Philadelphia	Passengers check bags and clear security at ACY, and go directly to PHL via motorcoach. Return trips deliver ticketed passengers from PHL to ACY.	

American Airlines offers a connecting bus to and from Philadelphia International Airport from Atlantic City International Airport. The service is ticketed & operated as an airline flight but utilizes buses, given Philadelphia's close proximity to Atlantic City and available connections as a major hub for American Airlines. This airside-to-airside service, which is solely for screened passengers who booked a seat on the route, is operated by American's bus service partner, Landline, on the airline's behalf.

== Statistics ==
=== Top destinations ===
Busiest domestic routes (August 2025 – July 2026)
Rank	City	Passengers	Carrier(s)
1	Orlando–International, Florida	71,120	Breeze, Spirit
2	Fort Lauderdale, Florida	69,700	Allegiant, Spirit
3	Fort Myers, Florida	40,940	Spirit
4	West Palm Beach, Florida	37,530	Spirit
5	Tampa, Florida	36,640	Breeze, Spirit
6	Myrtle Beach, South Carolina	14,000	Allegiant, Spirit
7	Orlando–Sanford, Florida	8,930	Allegiant
8	St. Pete/Clearwater, Florida	6,570	Allegiant
9	Punta Gorda, Florida	4,040	Allegiant
10	Charleston, South Carolina	2,400	Breeze

=== Annual traffic ===
Annual Passenger Traffic at ACY 2012-Present
Year	Passengers	% Change
2012	1,385,878	—
2013	1,132,898	▼18.3%
2014	1,211,667	▲7.0%
2015	1,200,293	▼0.9%
2016	1,207,273	▲0.6%
2017	1,102,092	▼8.7%
2018	1,164,937	▲5.7%
2019	1,134,745	▼2.6%
2020	450,636	▼60.3%
2021	867,039	▲92.4%
2022	955,947	▲10.3%
2023	926,112	▼3.1%
2024	1,042,253	▲12.5%
2025	845,108	▼18.9%

== Future ==
=== NJ Transit rail station ===
A bill has been submitted in the New Jersey legislature that would provide for a rail station at the airport that would become a part of NJ Transit's Atlantic City Line. No specific funding or budget has been drawn up, but estimates for the project are in the range of $25 million to $30 million.

=== NextGen Technical Park ===
A technology park housing Next Generation Air Transportation System is currently under construction on the airport property on a 55-acre (22 ha) lot near Amelia Earhart Boulevard and Delilah Road. The seven-building complex is set to contain 408,000 square feet (37,900 m^{2}) of offices, laboratories and research facilities. The park will focus on developing new computer equipment that will transform the country's air-traffic control program into a satellite-based system. The first of the buildings was originally set to open in April 2012 and will contain a lab for the FAA as well as research space for other tenants.

A second office park, the NextGen International Aviation Center for Excellence, is set to be built in nearby Hamilton Township, adjacent to the Hamilton Mall and Atlantic City Race Course, the latter of which is set to be renovated. A new transportation center at the site would transfer workers between the two complexes.

The FAA earmarked the 55 acres (22 ha) for the technical park's development in 2021.

=== Atlantic City Expressway connector ===
The SJTA revealed plans for a major road improvement project that would link the airport directly to the Atlantic City Expressway, with construction beginning in 2013. The plan included new ramps with two overpasses over the expressway. The road would connect Amelia Earhart Boulevard with a bridge over Airport Circle. Plans also call for building a service road with another overpass that would provide access to Delilah Road. Another project involves the installation of an overpass at the end of Amelia Earhart Boulevard next to the entrance to the FAA Technical Center. The proposed roadway would intrude upon a small section of a mobile home park and land owned by Egg Harbor Township. The project was delayed due to a lack of financing. The 2018 Statewide Transportation Improvement Program included the direct connector, with an estimated cost of $60 million.

=== Port Authority takeover ===
In February 2011, the New Jersey Legislature authorized the Atlantic City Tourism District, which would promote continued development of tourism in the region. A provision included the potential transfer of operations for ACY to the Port Authority of New York and New Jersey. New Jersey Governor Chris Christie in March 2013 ordered a takeover of the airport's operations by the Port Authority of New York and New Jersey. However, the deal never went through.

In 2019, the Atlantic County freeholders passed a resolution to have the Port Authority conduct a feasibility study to take over operations of the airport due to the airport's struggling financials.

== Accidents and incidents ==
- On July 26, 1969, TWA Flight 5787, a Boeing 707 operating as a training flight, crashed while performing a practice missed approach with an engine out on runway 13. All five crew members aboard were killed. The NTSB subsequently attributed the cause of the accident to be poor procedures for simulating engine failures and failure to apply the correct procedure for hydraulic failure, as well as loss of hydraulic power to the rudder in a critical flight condition.
