= Computer Usage Company =

American software company

- The company logo featured an abacus
- Industry: computer software
- Founded: New York City (March 1955)
- Founder: Elmer C. Kubie; John W. Sheldon
- Defunct: 1986
- Fate: Bankruptcy
- Area served: United States

Computer Usage Company (CUC) (1955–1986), sometimes called Computer Usage Corporation, was the first independent company to market custom software programming services.

== History ==
CUC is generally considered the first company to develop software independently and to have pioneered the field of programming services. Before this time, software was developed either by the users of the computers, or by the few commercial computer vendors.

Computer Usage Company (CUC) was founded in March 1955 by Elmer C. Kubie (1926–2004) and John W. Sheldon. They had formerly worked together at IBM, and planned to offer services to help develop computer programs. The initial investment of US$40,000 supported the founders and a staff of five. The first offices were located in New York City.

CUC's first project was a program written for California Research Corporation to simulate the flow of oil.

On October 3, 1955, Computer Usage Company, Inc., was incorporated in Delaware. George R. Trimble Jr. became Corporate Technical Director in February 1956 after work on the IBM 650. Trimble headed a project to computerize the air traffic control system of the Federal Aviation Administration. This work was done at the National Aviation Facilities Experimental Center in New Jersey.

In 1959 an office in Washington, DC was opened, since CUC had business with the US Navy. In April 1960 the company had an initial public offering of stock shares, and grew to three managers, 37 mathematicians, 6 physicists, and 3 engineers. Later in 1960 CUC established a division to sell computer time and in Spring 1961 opened an office in Los Angeles. Cuthbert Hurd joined the company as chairman in 1962, a former division director from IBM.

The FAA was planning to use the IBM 9020 model of the new IBM System/360, so contracted with CUC to develop a compiler for the JOVIAL computer language. The compiler was first developed on a simulator using the IBM 7030 before actual hardware was available. In early 1964, CUC developed software used by CBS Television to track the election results. Sheldon left later in 1964. Another major contract was to implement part of IBM's first time-sharing system, TSS/360. CUC was asked to manage the TSS project, as it was seen as losing ground to competitors in time-sharing. Realizing that performance would never meet expectations, CUC declined. In 1965 the Computer Usage Education subsidiary was formed, headed by Ascher Opler, which published software books and offered courses. One of its best sellers was on Programming the IBM system/360. Carl H. Reynolds joined as President of the new Computer Usage Development Company subsidiary in 1966. Reynolds had been director of programming for the Data Systems Division of IBM during the development of the System/360.

By 1967 CUC had a staff of over 700 people in 12 offices and revenues over $13 million. An office in Dallas, Texas was established to work on a contract with Texas Instruments to develop software including an operating system and a FORTRAN compiler for the TI Advanced Scientific Computer. During that time, the company's vice president was H. Dean Brown. Kubie and Reynolds left in July 1968 and the company changed direction under new president Charles Benton, Jr. from IBM's Federal Systems Division. Benton hired sales people instead of technical people, and contracts did not keep up with overhead.

CUC declared its first loss as a public company in 1969. Other competitors such as Computer Sciences Corporation were now larger. Sears announced they were in discussions for an acquisition, but talks fell through. By early 1970 Benton resigned and Hurd stepped in as president, although he lived in California. Other potential mergers were discussed, including Ross Perot who by now had founded his own service business Electronic Data Systems. CUC negotiated a contract to manage computer facilities at the Firemans Fund Insurance Company, which restored profitability for a time. Hurd left in 1974. Victor Bartoletti became president, but died in 1984 and George C. Strohl from Bank of America became president. However, losses continued to mount as the computer business was now very different from the field dominated by IBM 30 years earlier. By 1985, CUC lost $2.4 million on revenues of only $1.5 million. In 1986 CUC declared bankruptcy and was liquidated in what is known as Chapter 7.

== See also ==
- Software industry
- History of IBM
