= 177th Fighter Wing =

American military unit

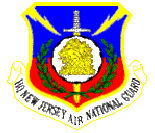
177th Fighter Wing

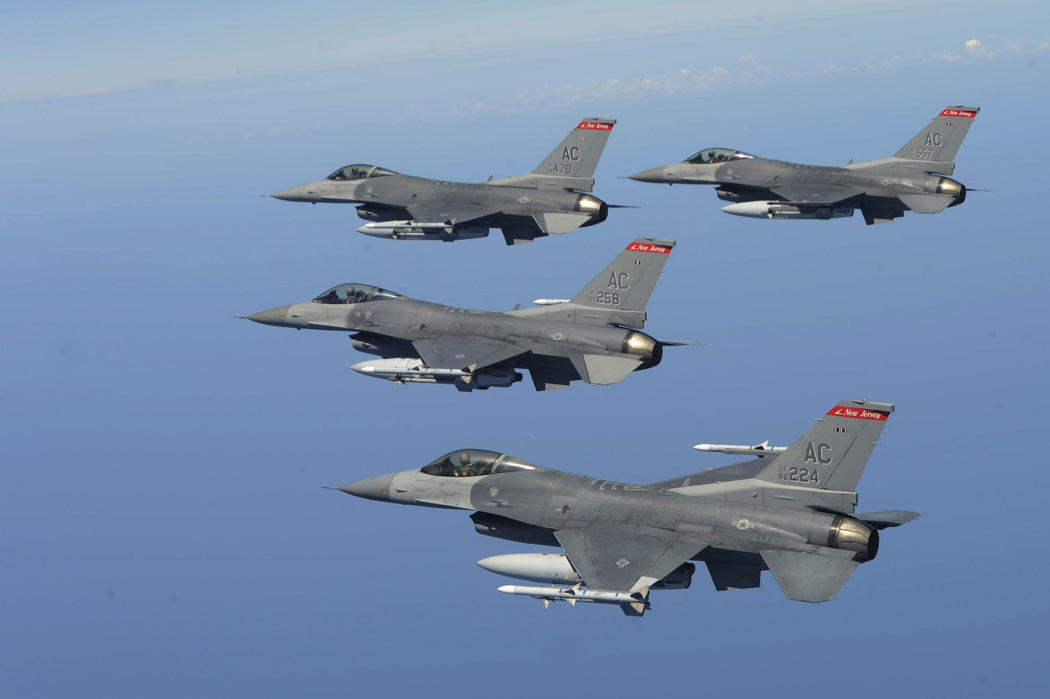
- A formation of F-16C Fighting Falcons from the 177th Fighter Wing flies a training mission 18 August 2009 near Atlantic City, N.J.
- Active: 15 October 1962 – present
- Country: United States
- Allegiance: New Jersey
- Branch: Air National Guard
- Type: Wing
- Role: Fighter
- Part of: New Jersey Air National Guard
- Garrison/HQ: Atlantic City Air National Guard Base, Egg Harbor, New Jersey
- Nickname: Jersey Devils
- Decorations: Air Force Outstanding Unit Award

Commanders
- Current commander: Colonel Benjamin W. Robbins

Insignia
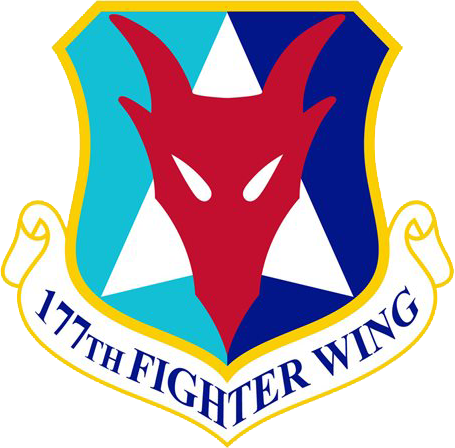
- 177th Fighter Wing emblem
- Tail code: AC black tail stripe "New Jersey"

The 177th Fighter Wing is a unit of the New Jersey Air National Guard, stationed at Atlantic City Air National Guard Base, New Jersey. If activated to federal service, the Wing is gained by the United States Air Force Air Combat Command.

The 119th Fighter Squadron assigned to the wing's 177th Operations Group, is a descendant organization of the World War I 5th Aviation School Squadron (later 119th Aero Squadron), established on 5 June 1917. It was reformed on 30 January 1930, as the 119th Observation Squadron, and is one of the 29 original observation squadrons of the United States Army National Guard formed before World War II.

== Mission ==
Federal Mission: provide combat-ready citizen airmen, aircraft and equipment for worldwide deployment in support of United States Air Force objectives.

State Mission: support the citizens of New Jersey by protecting life and property, preserving the peace, order, and public safety when called upon by the Governor.

== Units ==
- Headquarters 177th Fighter Wing
- 177th Operations Group
  - 119th Fighter Squadron
  - 227th Air Support Operations Squadron
  - 177th Operations Support Squadron
  - 177th Fighter Wing Detachment 1, Warren Grove Gunnery Range
- 177th Maintenance Group
  - 177th Aircraft Maintenance Squadron
  - 177th Maintenance Operations Flight
  - 177th Maintenance Squadron
- 177th Medical Group
- 177th Mission Support Group
  - 177th Civil Engineering Squadron
  - 177th Communications Squadron
  - 177th Force Support Squadron
  - 177th Logistics Readiness Squadron
  - 177th Security Forces Squadron

== History ==
=== Tactical Air Command ===
On 15 October 1962, the New Jersey Air National Guard 119th Tactical Fighter Squadron was authorized to expand to a group level, and the 177th Tactical Fighter Group was established by the National Guard Bureau. The 119th became the group's flying squadron. Other squadrons assigned into the group were the 117th Headquarters, 117th Material Squadron (Maintenance), 177th Combat Support Squadron, and the 177th USAF Dispensary.

January 1968 saw a new crisis, the seizure of the American ship USS Pueblo by North Korean forces, and the 119th was called to active duty. In May 1968, the 119th TFS was assigned to the 113th Tactical Fighter Wing, District of Columbia Air National Guard and stationed at Myrtle Beach Air Force Base, South Carolina when the active-duty 354th Tactical Fighter Wing deployed to South Korea. Group personnel were spread throughout the United States, Taiwan, South Korea, and South Vietnam. The 177th was placed in non-operational status. The 177th was reformed at Atlantic City airport in June 1969, and returned to New Jersey State control. The 119th Squadron transitioned into the F-105 "Thunderchief" in 1970.

=== Air Defense mission ===
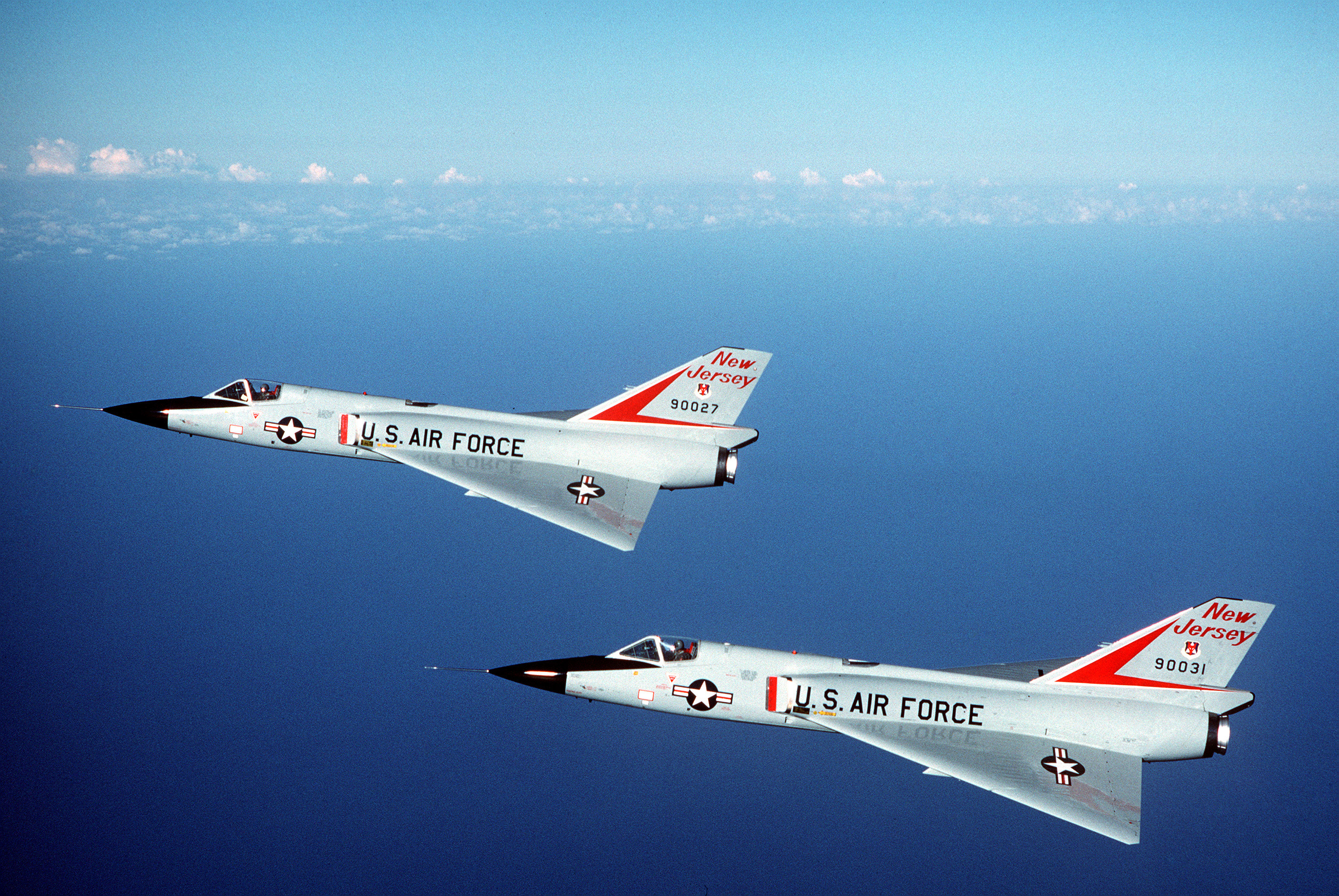
F-106s of the 119th Fighter-Interceptor Squadron, 1984

In 1972, the National Guard Bureau announced that the 177th would be gained by Aerospace Defense Command and be responsible for protecting the United States from airborne attacks, and so was redesignated as the 177th Fighter-Interceptor Group. In 1973, the unit transitioned to the Convair F-106 Delta Dart all-weather interceptor and assumed alert status the following year. In 1979 Aerospace Defense Command was inactivated and the group was reassigned to Air Defense Tactical Air Command, and then again changed to a numbered Air Force, First Air Force in 1985.

October 1984, the 177th participated in the air defense community's Worldwide Weapons Meet, known as "William Tell", at Tyndall Air Force Base, Florida. The unit captured the Special Achievement Award for Professionalism and Team Spirit, Overall Best Looking Aircraft, Best F-106 Team, Major Richard I. Bong Fighter Interceptor Award, Top Gun Award, F-106 Category Best Looking Aircraft Award, the Pratt and Whitney Award, the Sperry Corporation Award, and the General Dynamics Corporation Award.

In July 1988 the 177th started receiving their first General Dynamics F-16 Fighting Falcons, a compact, multi-role fighter aircraft. The initial F-16A/B's were of the Block 15 type, replacing the aging F-106 in the air defense role. Since this was the primary role of the unit, it was decided to upgrade these airframes with the air defense fighter variant. To that date the unit also flew some F-106s aside the F-16. The 119th FS was the last USAF unit to withdraw the F-106 from operational duty. In 1994 the squadron started trading in their air defense version of the Falcon for the more advanced block 25 version. In September 2007 the first USAF F-16Cs to be retired to AMARG were from the 119th Squadron who sent two to 309th Aerospace Maintenance and Regeneration Group. Replacing the aging block 25s were the not much newer block 30s. During this transition the mission of the squadron remained. This being a double task as an air defense squadron in the northern section of the US and as a multirole squadron to carry out contingency operations abroad.

During Operation Desert Shield/Storm, 73 members of the 177 FIG were called to active duty, and others served as volunteers. Fire fighters and Food Services personnel from the 177th Civil Engineering Squadron, elements of the 177th USAF Clinic, members of the Transportation section of the 177th Resource Management Squadron, and Explosive Ordnance Disposal personnel from the Consolidated Aircraft Maintenance Squadron provided backfill at various bases whose members had been deployed to Saudi Arabia. Those activated from the 177th Security Police Flight served at home station. And the 177th Chaplain's Assistant completed a five-month tour of active duty in Saudi Arabia. All members were returned to normal Guard status at home base by July 1991.

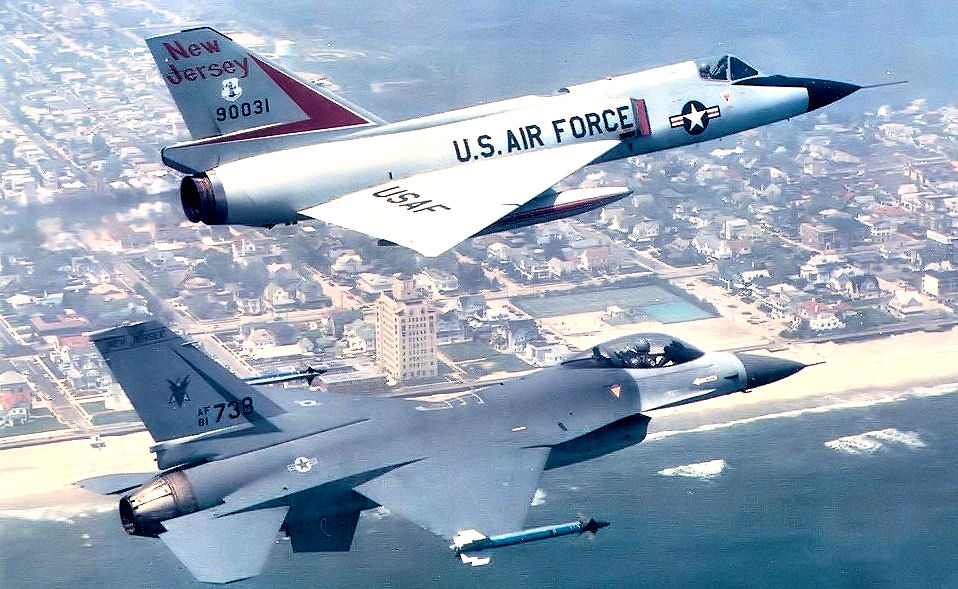
Last F-106 59-0031 of the 119th FIS with a newly assigned F-16A 81-739 of the squadron flying over the Atlantic City Beach, 1988

Since October 1998, the wing has had an active involvement in Operation Noble Eagle, Operation Southern Watch, Operation Northern Watch, Operation Enduring Freedom, Operation Iraqi Freedom, Operation Freedom's Sentinel, and Operation Inherent Resolve.

From 1 May through 13 June 1998, the wing deployed five F-16C Fighting Falcon aircraft and 46 personnel to Howard AFB, Panama, in support of OPERATION CORONET NIGHTHAWK. 130 personnel rotated on a two-week basis during the six-week deployment. Operating as part of a joint interagency task force, the wing's role was to detect and identify suspected drug smuggling aircraft. Once identified, the suspected aircraft are turned over to law enforcement agencies for apprehension.

As a result of the September 11 attacks on the United States in 2001 the Wing found itself in a key position. Located between New York and Washington DC, the 119th FS was immediately tasked with providing combat air patrols over cities in its region. In fact three aircraft were scrambled to intercept the aircraft that impacted the Pentagon, but were too late. They were then vectored to intercept flight 93 which eventually crashed in Pennsylvania. Following the attacks, the 119th FS began flying missions for Operation Noble Eagle. On 12 July 2002 the squadron flew its 1000th mission for Operation Nobel Eagle. From that year they also started to contribute in other overseas contingency operations.

The wing has earned numerous awards to include the Air Force Outstanding Unit Award for the 2016-2017 and the 2018-2019 periods. In 2019, the 177th Aircraft Maintenance Squadron (AMXS) was recognized as the Air National Guard top maintenance unit when it won the Category 1 Maintenance Effectiveness Award. The 177th Medical Group earned the Air Force Outstanding Unit Award in 2009.

=== Lineage ===
- Designated 177th Tactical Fighter Group, and allotted to New Jersey ANG, 1962

Extended federal recognition and activated on 15 October 1962
Nonoperational, from 26 January 1968 to 18 June 1969
Redesignated 177th Fighter-Interceptor Group on 27 January 1973
Redesignated 177th Fighter Group on 15 March 1992
Redesignated 177th Fighter Wing on 11 October 1995

=== Assignments ===
- New Jersey Air National Guard, 15 October 1962

Gained by: Tactical Air Command
Gained by: Aerospace Defense Command, 27 January 1973
Gained by: Tactical Air Command, 1 October 1979 – present

=== Components ===
- 177th Operations Group, 11 October 1995 – present
- 119th Tactical Fighter Squadron (later 119th Fighter-Interceptor Squadron, 119th Fighter Squadron), 15 October 1962 – 26 January 1968; 18 June 1969 – 11 October 1995

=== Stations ===
- National Aviation Facilities Experimental Center, Atlantic City, New Jersey, 15 October 1962 – 26 January 1968; 18 June 1969

Designated: Atlantic City Air National Guard Base, New Jersey, 1991–present

=== Aircraft ===
- F-16C/D Fighting Falcon (1994–present)
- F-16A ADF Fighting Falcon (1988–94)
- F-106A/B Delta Dart (1973–88)
- F-105B Thunderchief (1970–73)
- F-100C Super Sabre (1963–70)
- F-86H Sabre (1962–63)
