= TWA Flight 5787 =

1969 aviation accident in New Jersey

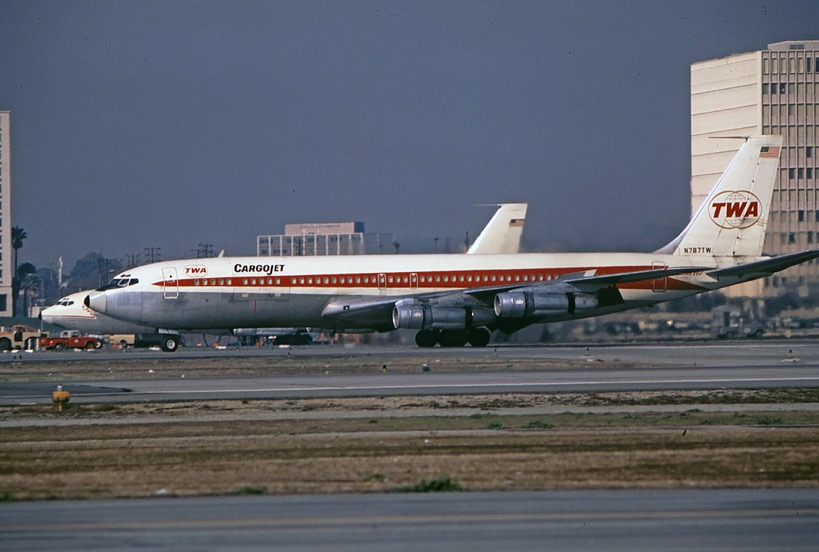
- N787TW, the aircraft involved in the accident, pictured in May 1969

Accident
- Date: July 26, 1969
- Summary: Loss of control due to hydraulic failure during simulated three-engine landing
- Site: Atlantic City International Airport, near Egg Harbor Township, New Jersey; 39°27′14″N 74°34′18.18″W

Aircraft
- Aircraft type: Boeing 707-331C
- Operator: Trans World Airlines
- Registration: N787TW
- Flight origin: John F. Kennedy Airport, Queens, New York
- Stopover: Atlantic City Airport, Pomona, New Jersey
- Destination: John F. Kennedy Airport, Queens, New York
- Occupants: 5
- Passengers: 0
- Crew: 5
- Fatalities: 5
- Survivors: 0

Trans World Airlines Flight 5787 was an unscheduled training flight of a Boeing 707 from Atlantic City Airport in Pomona, New Jersey in 1969. The flight was planned as a proficiency check, testing crew response to a simulated single-engine failure during takeoff and landing. Because of a fatigue failure of a hydraulic pipe, hydraulic power was lost while flying at low speed on three engines, resulting in loss of control and a crash killing all on board.

== Aircraft and crew ==
The aircraft involved was a Boeing 707-331C (registration number N787TW), first flown in 1964. The aircraft had 17,590 flight hours at the time of the accident.

The crew, and sole occupants, were instructor-pilot Captain Donald Sklarin (38), Captain Harry D. Gaines (56), Second Officer Frank J. Jonke (29), and two additional line Captains undergoing training .

== Accident ==
On July 26, 1969, Trans World Airlines (TWA) aircraft N787TW arrived at John F. Kennedy Airport at the end of a scheduled cargo flight. The aircraft was then released for non-revenue training use as Flight 5787, providing recurrent training and proficiency checks for three TWA line captains. Flight 5787 originated at JFK, and was planned to proceed to the National Aviation Facilities Experimental Center (NAFEC) at Atlantic City Airport to perform the required training and proficiency check maneuvers.

After take-off from JFK, Flight 5787 proceeded to Atlantic City Airport without incident. On arrival, the aircraft landed on runway 13 with the first check-ride Captain Gaines at the controls, in the left-hand seat. The crew requested a 180° turnaround and an immediate take-off on runway 31, which was granted. The proficiency checker briefed the take-off as a simulated engine failure after V_{1}. The take-off was carried out and the No. 4 power lever was retarded to the simulated failure idle position. The pilots climbed to 1,500 ft (457 m) and vectored to intercept the ILS course at the outer marker. The tower granted Flight 5787 permission to either land, make a touch-and-go landing, or make a low approach of the runway at its discretion.

The proficiency checker briefed the check pilot to carry out a three-engine ILS approach and expect a three engine go-around at the decision height. The proficiency checker called for the go-around at the decision height, and the check captain complied, applying full power on engine nos. 1, 2, and 3, leaving engine no. 4 at idle, then calling for flaps 25 and landing gear up. However, neither the flaps nor landing gear moved from their previous positions. Approximately 16 to 18 seconds after the call for go-around, one of the observing crew commented that all hydraulic power had been lost. In accordance with the current operating procedures, the hydraulic pumps were disengaged. The crew did not call for or follow the hydraulic fluid loss checklist.

With low airspeed, 3 engines, and no hydraulics to power the rudder actuator, directional control was lost. The aircraft rolled and pitched down, impacting the ground in a right wing low nose down attitude. All five crew were killed.

== Causes ==
The cause of the accident was found to be poor procedures for simulating engine failures and failure to apply the correct procedure for hydraulic failure, as well as loss of hydraulic power to the rudder in a critical flight condition. The loss of hydraulic power was found to be due to a fatigue failure in the left outboard spoiler actuator downline, dumping hydraulic fluid from the aircraft's utility hydraulic system overboard. With no power to the rudder actuator, at low speed, undercarriage down, full flaps, and only three engines, the aircraft was not capable of recovery and the crash was inevitable.

== Consequences ==
Procedures for hydraulic failure and simulating engine failures were reviewed and amended as deemed necessary.
