= William J. Hughes Technical Center =

Aviation research and testing facility in Egg Harbor Township, New Jersey

Coordinates: 39.45143°N 74.57457°W

The William J. Hughes Technical Center for Advanced Aerospace is an aviation research and development, and test and evaluation facility. The Technical Center serves as the national scientific test base for the Federal Aviation Administration (FAA). Technical Center programs include research and development, test and evaluation, and verification and validation in air traffic control, communications, navigation, airports, aircraft safety, and security. They also include long-range development of aviation systems and concepts, development of new air traffic control equipment and software, and modification of existing systems and procedures. Through a series of initiatives known collectively as NextGen, the Technical Center is contributing to the Next Generation Air Transportation System.

It is alongside Atlantic City International Airport in Egg Harbor Township, New Jersey, 10 miles (16 km) northwest of Atlantic City, and covers over 5,000 acres (2,023 ha). The Technical Center consists of laboratories, test facilities, support facilities, the Atlantic City International Airport, and a non-commercial aircraft hangar. The Technical Center is also home to the Department of Homeland Security, the Federal Air Marshal Service Training Center, Transportation Security Lab, and the Coast Guard Air Station Atlantic City, as well as the New Jersey Air National Guard 177th Fighter Wing. While the Technical Center works mainly in aviation, it also provides other services for the Department of Homeland Security. Portions of the land of the technical center are in Galloway Township, and Hamilton Township.

The Technical Center site's soil and groundwater were contaminated with pollutants including mercury, perfluorinated compounds, arsenic, benzene, cadmium, chloroform, lead, toluene, and numerous other toxic or environmentally harmful chemicals by US Navy, airport, and FAA operations from the 1940s to the 1970s. The Technical Center is now a Superfund site, where the FAA and EPA are engaged in cleaning up the pollution and preventing it from spreading outside the site.

== History ==
The National Aviation Facilities Experimental Center (NAFEC) was founded July 1, 1958, by the Airways Modernization Board (AMB) and located in Galloway Township, New Jersey, near Atlantic City, New Jersey. On November 1, 1959, after passage of the Federal Aviation Act of 1958, it came under the newly created US Federal Aviation Agency (FAA). Its purpose was to conduct research and development on air traffic control computers, transponders, and advanced radar equipment. The success (in terms of funding and research activity) eventually forced the Civil Aeronautics Administration (CAA) to close its own Technical Evaluation and Development Center in Indianapolis starting in 1959.

The computerized air traffic control developed at NAFEC was based on the IBM 9020, special hardware developed by IBM. Software was developed by NAFEC, IBM, and under contract to Computer Usage Company. The system remained in operation until the 1980s. The former 1942 Naval Air Station became the Atlantic City International Airport. It was renamed the FAA Technical Center in 1980, and in 1996 it was named the William J. Hughes Technical Center, after Ambassador and Congressman William J. Hughes. Since 1958, the center's core activities were accelerating programs to improve aviation safety and updating the air traffic control system, Next Generation Air Transportation System (NextGen) being a part of it. Besides the research and development project work, the FAA field facilities have daily operational support all over the country from the center operating 24 hours a day. In order to keep critical systems operational, center experts analyze problems and make software changes.

=== Early achievements ===
- 1961 - Automation data processing center work to automate Air Traffic Control
- 1963 - First Wake Vortex Turbulence Test by helicopter
- 1966 - First operational testing of an Automated En-route Air Traffic Control System
- 1966 - Introduction of the Visual Approach Slope Indicator to provide improved guidance to runways
- 1969 - First test of a commercial solid-state aircraft cockpit display
- 1972 - First Air Traffic Control Tower cab mock up to test controller work areas and do airport observations

Other achievements which have recently enhanced the efficiency and safety of the flying public include:

- Air Traffic Control Displays
- Satellite Navigation
- Tower Laboratory Simulations
- Weather
- Reduced Vertical Separation Minima
- Human Factors
- Aircraft Fire Safety
- Engineered Material Arrestor System
- Foreign Object Debris Detection

== Frank A. LoBiondo National Aerospace Safety and Security Campus ==
Section 5502 of the National Defense Authorization Act for Fiscal Year 2025 redesignated the campus and grounds of the center as the Frank A. LoBiondo National Aerospace Safety and Security Campus in honor of former Congressman Frank LoBiondo, who represented the congressional district where the center is located from 1995 to 2019. The bill was signed into law on December 23, 2024 and the campus was rededicated at a ceremony on September 12, 2025.
