= Cuthbert Hurd =

American computer scientist

Cuthbert Corwin Hurd
- Born: April 5, 1911; Estherville, Iowa, U.S.
- Died: May 22, 1996 (aged 85); Portola Valley, California, U.S.
- Education: Drake University; Iowa State University; University of Illinois Urbana-Champaign
- Scientific career
- Fields: Computer science

Cuthbert Corwin Hurd (April 5, 1911 – May 22, 1996) was an American computer scientist and entrepreneur, who was instrumental in helping the International Business Machines Corporation develop its first general-purpose computers.

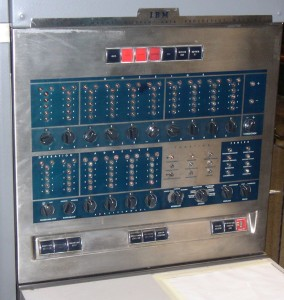
The IBM 650 was developed by the division headed by Cuthbert Hurd

== Life ==
Hurd was born April 5, 1911, in Estherville, Iowa. He received his B.A. in mathematics from Drake University in 1932, his M.S. in mathematics from Iowa State College in 1934, and his Ph.D. in mathematics from the University of Illinois in 1936. Waldemar Joseph Trjitzinsky was his advisor, and dissertation was Asymptotic theory of linear differential equations singular in the variable of differentiation and in a parameter. He did post-doctorate work at Columbia University and the Massachusetts Institute of Technology (MIT). He was assistant professor at Michigan State University from 1936 to 1942.

During World War II Hurd taught at the US Coast Guard Academy with the rank of Lieutenant Commander, and co-authored the textbook for teaching Mathematics to mariners. From 1945 to 1947 he was dean of Allegheny College. In 1947 he moved to Oak Ridge, Tennessee, where he worked for Union Carbide as mathematician at the United States Atomic Energy Commission facility Oak Ridge National Laboratory. He taught and later served as a technical research head under Alston Scott Householder. At Oak Ridge he supervised the installation of an IBM 602 calculating punched card machine to automate the tracking of material in the facility, and saw the potential for automating the massive amounts of computation needed for nuclear Physics research. In February 1948 he was invited to the dedication of the IBM Selective Sequence Electronic Calculator (SSEC), a custom-built machine in New York City. He asked if the SSEC could be used for calculations being done at Oak Ridge for the NEPA project to power an airplane with a nuclear reactor, but the demands for the SSEC produced a backlog. In the meanwhile, he requested that the first IBM 604 calculating card punch be delivered to Oak Ridge. It was, but the calculations remained slow with the limited electronics in the 604.

=== IBM ===
From 1949 to 1962, he worked at IBM, where he founded the Applied Science Department and pushed reluctant management into the world of computing. Hurd hired John von Neumann as a consultant. The eccentric genius was known for his fast driving, and IBM often would pay von Neumann's traffic fines. They developed a personal friendship, with Hurd visiting von Neumann in Walter Reed Army Medical Center as he was dying of cancer.

At the time, IBM calculators were programmed by plugging and unplugging wires manually into large panels. The concept of storing the program as well as data in computer memory was generally called the Von Neumann architecture (although others developed the concept about the same time). IBM had built the experimental stored-program SSEC, but company president Thomas J. Watson favored basing commercial products on punched card technology with manual programming. Hurd hired a team who would be the first professional computer software writers, such as John Backus and Fred Brooks. The first step was to offer a calculator that could be programmed on punch cards in addition to a manual plugboard. This was the Card-Programmed Electronic Calculator, announced in May 1949. It was essentially a commercialized version of experiments done by Wallace John Eckert and customers at Northrop Corporation, but became a very popular product, shipping several thousand units in various models.

Based on this demand, Hurd advised new company president Tom Watson, Jr. to build the first IBM commercial stored program computer, first called the Defense Calculator. It was marketed as the IBM 701 in 1952. There were 18 model 701 machines built (in addition to the Engineering development machine).

In 1953 Hurd convinced IBM management to develop what became the IBM 650 Magnetic Drum Data Processing Machine. Although the UNIVAC I (and Ferranti Mark 1 in England) had been introduced earlier than any IBM computer, its high price (while IBM offered monthly leases) limited sales. The lower expense of the 650 meant it could be purchased in much larger quantities. Almost 2000 were produced between 1953 and 1962, to commercial customers as well as academics. On January 19, 1955, Hurd became director of the IBM Electronic Data Processing Machines Division when T. Vincent Learson was promoted to Vice President of Sales. In 1955, Hurd made a proposal to Edward Teller for a computer to be used at the Lawrence Livermore Laboratory. This would evolve into the IBM "Stretch" project. The ambitious promises made for the performance of the machine were not met when it was finally delivered in 1961 as the model 7030, although techniques developed and lessons learned in its design were used on other IBM products.

=== California ===
After 1962, he served as chairman of the Computer Usage Company, the first independent computer software company, and president from 1970 through 1974.

He then consulted for various firms in Silicon Valley, and served as an expert witness in the IBM antitrust cases. From 1978 to 1986, Hurd served as chairman for Picodyne Corporation, which he co-founded with H. Dean Brown. Hurd was a founder of Quintus Computer Systems in 1983 with William Kornfeld, Lawrence Byrd, Fernando Pereira and David H. D. Warren to commercialize a Prolog compiler. Hurd was president and chairman until Quintus was sold to Intergraph Corporation in October 1989.

In 1967. Drake University awarded Hurd an honorary LLD degree. In 1986 he received the IEEE Computer Pioneer award by the IEEE Computer Society for his contributions to early computing. In his later life he lived in Portola Valley, California, became an avid gardener and studied native California plants. A variety of Arctostaphylos manzanita is named Dr. Hurd for him. He died there May 22, 1996. He endowed scholarships in Mathematics and Computer Science at Stanford University.

== Publications ==
- "Asymptotic theory of linear differential equations singular in the variable of differentiation and in a parameter" (PDF). Tohoku Mathematical Journal. Vol. 44 (first series). 1938. pp. 243–274.
- "Asymptotic theory of linear differential equations containing two parameters" (PDF). Tohoku Mathematical Journal. Vol. 45 (first series). 1939. pp. 58–68.
- 1943, Mathematics for Mariners with Chester E. Dimick. New York: D Van Nostrand Company Inc, 1943.
- 1950, "The IBM Card-Programmed Electronic Calculator" in: Proceedings, Seminar on Scientific Computation November, 1949, IBM, p. 37-41.
- 1955, "Mechanical Translation: New Challenge to Communication Ornstein", in: Science 21 October 1955: pp. 745–748.
- Nicholas Metropolis; Jack Howlett; Gian-Carlo Rota, eds. (November 1980). "Computer Developments at IBM". A history of computing in the twentieth century: a collection of essays. Academic Press. ISBN 978-0-12-491650-0.
- 1983. Special Issue: The IBM 701 Thirtieth Anniversary - IBM Enters the Computing Field, Annals of the History of Computing, Vol. 5 (No. 2), 1983
- 1985, "A note on early Monte Carlo computations and scientific meetings", in: IEEE Annals of the History of Computing archive, Volume 7, Issue 2 (April 1985) pp 141–155.
- 1986, "Prologue," IEEE Annals of the History of Computing, vol. 8, no. 1, pp. 6–7, Jan-Mar, 1986

== See also ==
- List of pioneers in computer science
- History of computing
- Timeline of computing
- History of computing hardware
- IBM 700/7000 series
