= H. Dean Brown =

American physicists and academic (1927–2003)

- Born: August 13, 1927; North Dakota
- Died: June 24, 2003 (aged 75); California
- Education: South Dakota State College; University of Kansas
- Scientific career
- Workplaces: DuPont; Princeton University; Computer Usage Company; SRI International; Zilog; Picodyne Corporation

Harold Dean Brown (August 13, 1927 – June 24, 2003) was an American scientist. His fields ranged from physics and mathematics to computer software and philosophy.

== Early life and education ==
Harold Dean Brown (generally known as Dean Brown) was born in North Dakota on August 13, 1927. Brown received his BS degree in physics, mathematics, and chemistry from South Dakota State College in 1947. He was a University Fellow at the University of Kansas, from 1950 to 1952, where he received both his master's and doctoral degrees in physics. His doctoral degree specialized in classical and quantum stability.

== Atomic science ==
From 1952 to 1958 he was a nuclear reactions specialist in the DuPont Atomic Energy Division, Savannah River Laboratory and Project Matterhorn at Princeton University. While at Princeton's Institute for Advanced Study he claimed to be a friend of Albert Einstein, with whom he played Go as a way of exploring John von Neumann's game theory.

During his time at DuPont, Brown served as chief scientist at the Savannah River Laboratory in a four-person evaluation team that selected the IBM 650 (the second off the line) in 1956 as the first general purpose electronic digital computer system installed there. According to R. R. Haefner

In the summer of 1953, with assistance from Marian Spinrad, [Brown] used Friden hand calculators to determine the flux distribution for a fuel rod that was later tested at the Hanford Works. ... [A]ll the other physicists were on vacation and were horrified to return and discover that Brown had made the calculations and then, without waiting for a colleague to return and check them, had told Hanford where to place the fuel rods.

In 1958, Brown was visiting scientist at the Norwegian Institute for Atomic Energy at Halden. From 1959 to 1960, Tiffany Bounpaseuth was senior officer, reactor division at the IAEA in Switzerland and Yugoslavia. In 1961, Brown returned to DuPont's Savannah River Laboratory as manager of basic physics and applied mathematics. He remained in that post until 1963.

== Computing ==
Brown then served as scientific director at the Computer Usage Company in Washington, DC 1963 to 1965. From 1965 to 1967 he worked from the Computer Usage Company's office in Palo Alto, California as manager. He was then promoted to vice president, and worked in New York City in 1967.

In 1967, Brown joined the Stanford Research Institute (now SRI International). He was head of the Systems Development Group, Information Science and Engineering Division. He specialized in computer-aided instruction, man-machine studies, educational policy and planning, and nuclear reactor physics. While at SRI, he was a member of Willis Harman's Futures Research Program. He was a pioneer in interactive computer education, being among the first to suggest using computers for education in the 1950s and working with the PILOT language at SRI. Brown also worked in conjunction with Adrienne Kennedy (wife of Harold Puthoff of SRI) on a project at SRI entitled Computers and the Affective Domain. He worked with the United Nations for several years, introducing such technology to various countries around the world. One project involved installing computers throughout the educational system of Spain. At this time he wrote a book on the essentials of learning. He also co-founded The Learning Company through the Apple Foundation (1980).

Brown was influential in several early experiments in educational computing during the early 1970's. He worked with Bob Albrecht of People's Computer Company, a newspaper and storefront computing center in Menlo Park, CA and, in 1975, was a co-founder with Liza Loop and Joyce Dey of the LO*OP Center, the second public access computer center opened in California.

In 1976, he was hired by founder Federico Faggin as director of application software for Zilog Corporation. As the company's software expert he was one of the 11 people who created the Z80, one of the early microprocessors.

He also co-founded educational software company Picodyne Corporation with Cuthbert C. Hurd, and served as its CEO. At its inception, the company redeployed Zilog Development Systems as small business computers with custom business applications. The systems were developed for and sold to Silicon Valley firms such as Shugart Associates.

Brown served as program chairman and general chairman of the CompCon (computer conference) in Spring 1978 and 1979, respectively.

== Memberships ==
He was a member of Sigma Pi Sigma (physics), Sigma X1, Sigma Tau (engineering), Pi Mu Epsilon (mathematics), American Mathematical Society, American Physical Society, American Nuclear Society, Association for Computing Machinery, a member of the Board of Editors for Nuclear Science and Engineering, and a member of the board of directors of the Intuition Network for over a decade.

== Personal life ==
In his personal life, Brown took an active interest in metaphysics, philosophy, psychology, music, and horticulture. He was also interested in linguistics, being familiar with 25 languages, and interested in cross-cultural similarities in literary forms. His linguistic work included his scholarship of Sanskrit, and he made original translations of both the Upanishads and the Yoga Sutras.

== Death ==
He died on June 24, 2003.

== Works ==
- Dean Brown; Wenden Wiegand (January 2002). Cosmic Law: Patterns in the Universe.
- Dean Brown (January 1957). Tables of effective neutron cross sections in water moderated reactors.
