= Atlantic City Air National Guard Base =

US Air National Guard base in New Jersey

- Near Atlantic City, New Jersey in the United States of America
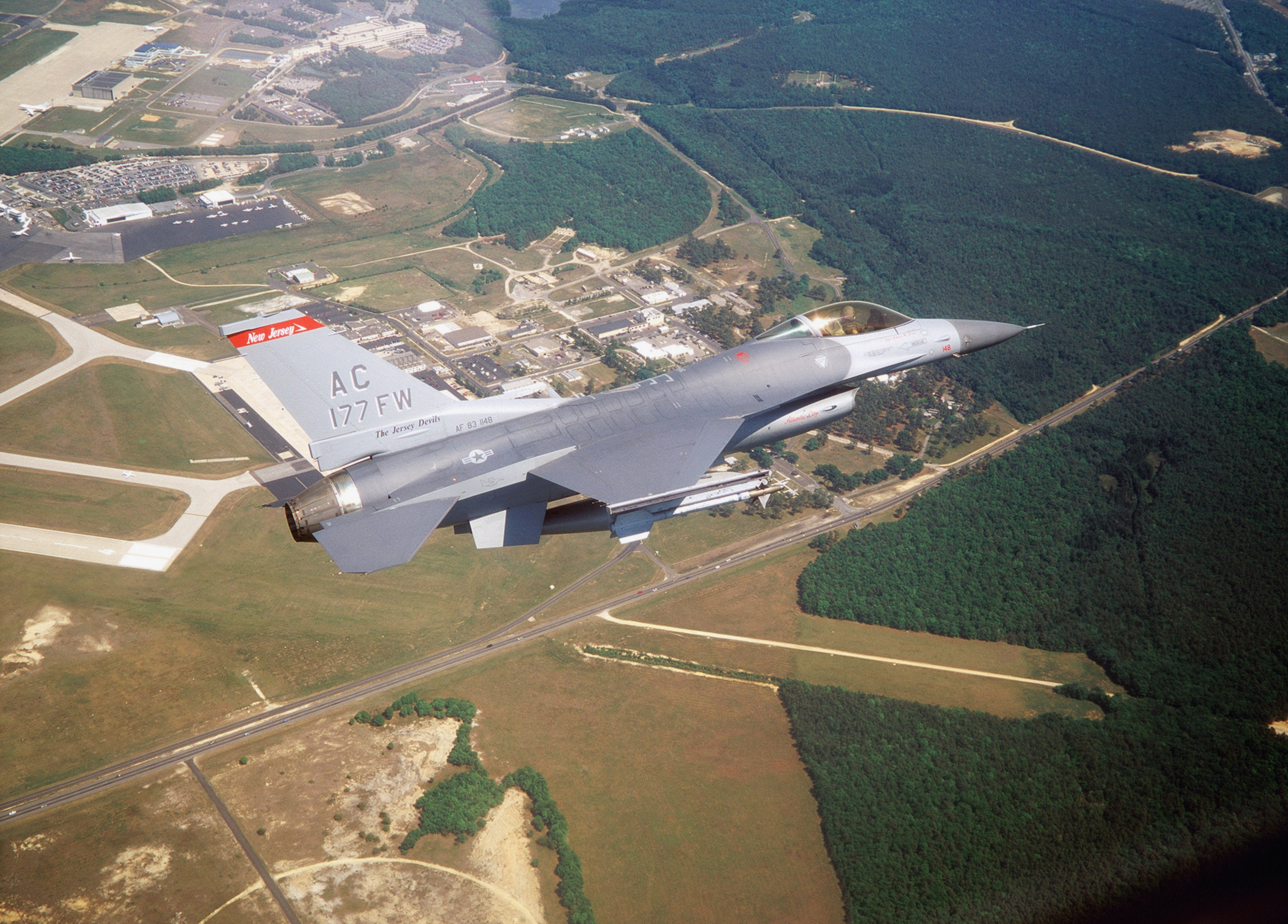
- An F-16C Fighting Falcon of the 177th Fighter Wing over its base at Atlantic City Air National Guard Base.

Site information
- Type: Air National Guard Base
- Owner: Department of Defense
- Operator: United States Air Force
- Controlled by: New Jersey Air National Guard
- Condition: Operational
- Website: www.177fw.ang.af.mil

Location
- Location within New Jersey Location within the United States
- Coordinates: 39°26′43.3″N 74°34′52.4″W

Site history
- Built: 1958
- In use: 1958 – present

Garrison information
- Current commander: Colonel Bradford R. Everman
- Garrison: 177th Fighter Wing

Airfield information
- Identifiers: IATA: ACY, ICAO: KACY, FAA LID: ACY, WMO: 72407
- Elevation: 22.86 metres (75 ft) AMSL
Runways
Direction	Length and surface
13/31	3,048 metres (10,000 ft) Asphalt
4/22	1,872.6 metres (6,144 ft) Asphalt/Concrete
- Airfield shared with Atlantic City International Airport; Source: Federal Aviation Administration

Atlantic City Air National Guard Base is an Air National Guard base located at Atlantic City International Airport in New Jersey. The base is home to the New Jersey Air National Guard's 177th Fighter Wing, operating the F-16C Fighting Falcon.

== Role and operations ==
Established in 1958 at Atlantic City International Airport, Atlantic City Air National Guard Base is home to the 177th Fighter Wing (177 FW), an Air Combat Command (ACC)-gained unit of the New Jersey Air National Guard, operating the F-16C/D Fighting Falcon. Since October 1998, the unit has had an active involvement in Operation Noble Eagle, Operation Southern Watch, Operation Northern Watch, Operation Enduring Freedom and Operation Iraqi Freedom.

The 177th Fighter Wing has dual federal (USAF augmentation) and state (support to New Jersey) missions. It carries out Homeland Security air defense missions under the control of the Eastern Air Defense Sector, part of the North American Aerospace Defense Command for peacetime air sovereignty, air defense, and airborne counter-drug operations.
