= Coast Guard Air Station Atlantic City =

US Coast Guard base in Egg Harbor Township, New Jersey

- Unit Patch CGAS Atlantic City
- Active: 1998–present
- Country: United States
- Branch: United States Coast Guard
- Type: Air Station
- Role: To patrol the Mid Atlantic coast from Connecticut to Virginia

Commanders
- Commanding Officer: CAPT Jeffrey Graham

Aircraft flown
- Helicopter: 12 MH-65E Dolphin

Coast Guard Air Station Atlantic City is a United States Coast Guard Air Station located 9 miles northwest of Atlantic City at the Atlantic City International Airport in Egg Harbor Township, New Jersey. It is the northernmost, largest air station within the Coast Guard Fifth District.

== Operations and missions ==
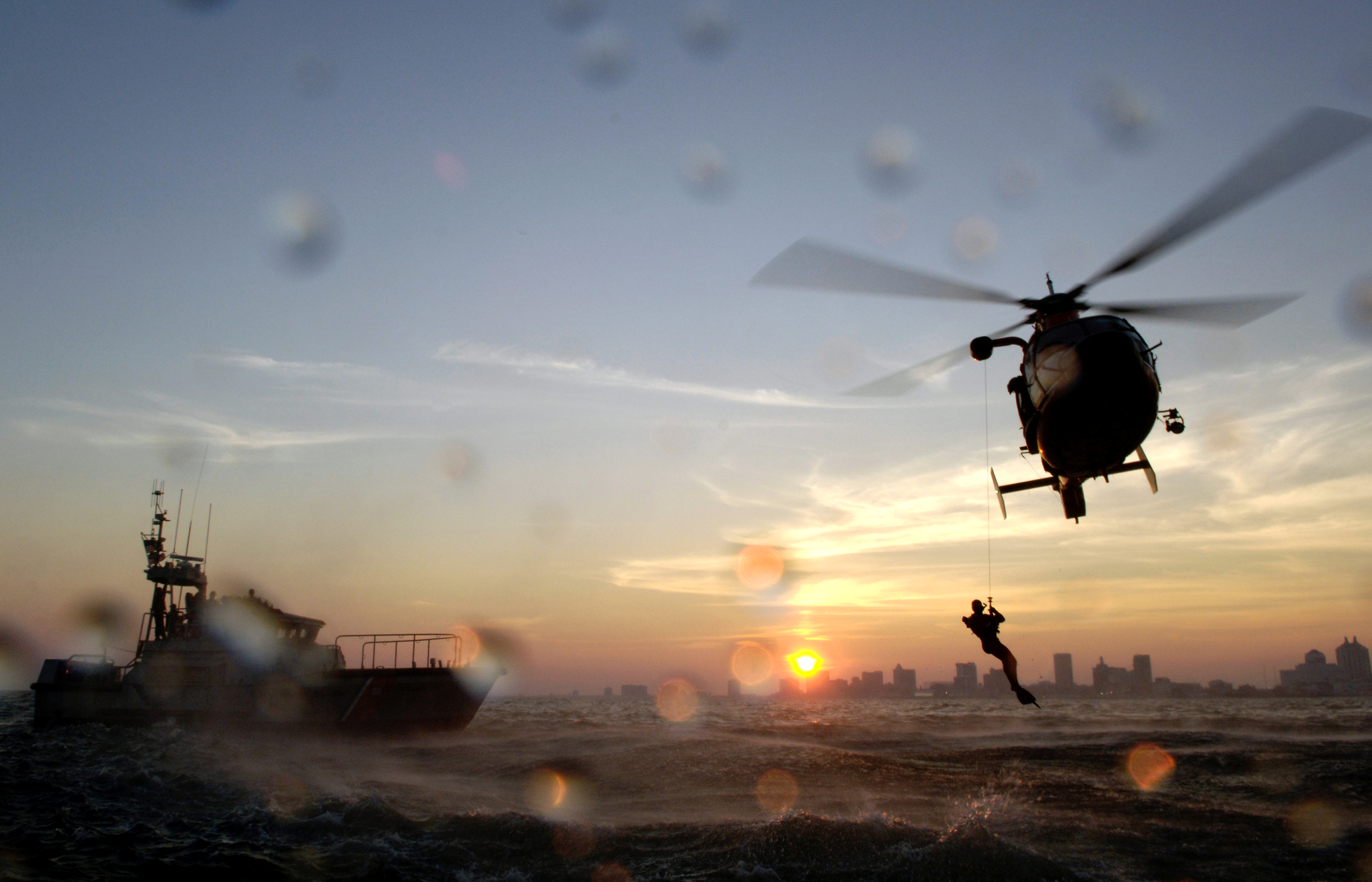
HH-65C and crew offshore of Atlantic City, NJ

Coast Guard Air Station Atlantic City (CGAS Atlantic City) is located at the Federal Aviation Administration's (FAA) William J Hughes Technical Center at the Atlantic City International Airport. It is one of two air stations in the Fifth Coast Guard District.

Air Station Atlantic City consists of 12 MH-65E Dolphin helicopters and maintains two MH-65E helicopters in 30-minute response status. Approximately 250 aviation personnel are staffed at the facility, in addition to Coast Guard Reserve personnel and Coast Guard Auxiliary members that augment its Active Duty forces.

CGAS Atlantic City's mission supports a wide range of Coast Guard operations such as search and rescue (SAR), Maritime Law enforcement, port security, Rotary Wing Aerial Intercept, Aids to Navigation support and Marine Environmental Protection for both District One and District Five, which includes the coastlines of Connecticut, New York, New Jersey, Pennsylvania, Delaware, Maryland and Virginia as well as protecting the interior bays and rivers such as the Chesapeake, Delaware, Hudson and Long Island Sound.

Since 2006, CGAS Atlantic City has provided aircrews and aircraft to the Washington, D.C. area as part of Operation Noble Eagle, a Department of Defense (NORAD) mission to protect the airspace around the nation's capital.

== History ==
CGAS Atlantic City was opened on May 18, 1998. The facility is the newest and largest single airframe unit of the Coast Guard's Air Stations and is a product of merging the former Coast Guard Air Station Brooklyn and Group Air Station Cape May, New Jersey into one unit.

Group Air Station Atlantic City provides mission support services to Atlantic coastal regions from Connecticut to Virginia. Air Station Brooklyn and Air Station Cape May's operational responsibilities overlapped in the region, and so the United States Coast Guard decided that the same level of coverage would be maintained by consolidating both air stations into one facility.

The first life-saving stations along the New Jersey coastline were built in 1849 in response to a deadly string of shipping accidents. The term "Group" was in reference to life saving stations from Barnegat, New Jersey to Cape May, New Jersey. In 1969 Cape May became a Group Air Station when three helicopters were stationed there under command of Group Commander. Originally organized into two separate group offices based in Atlantic City and Cape May, these two command structures were combined in 1982.
