= 37th Training Wing =

37th Training Wing

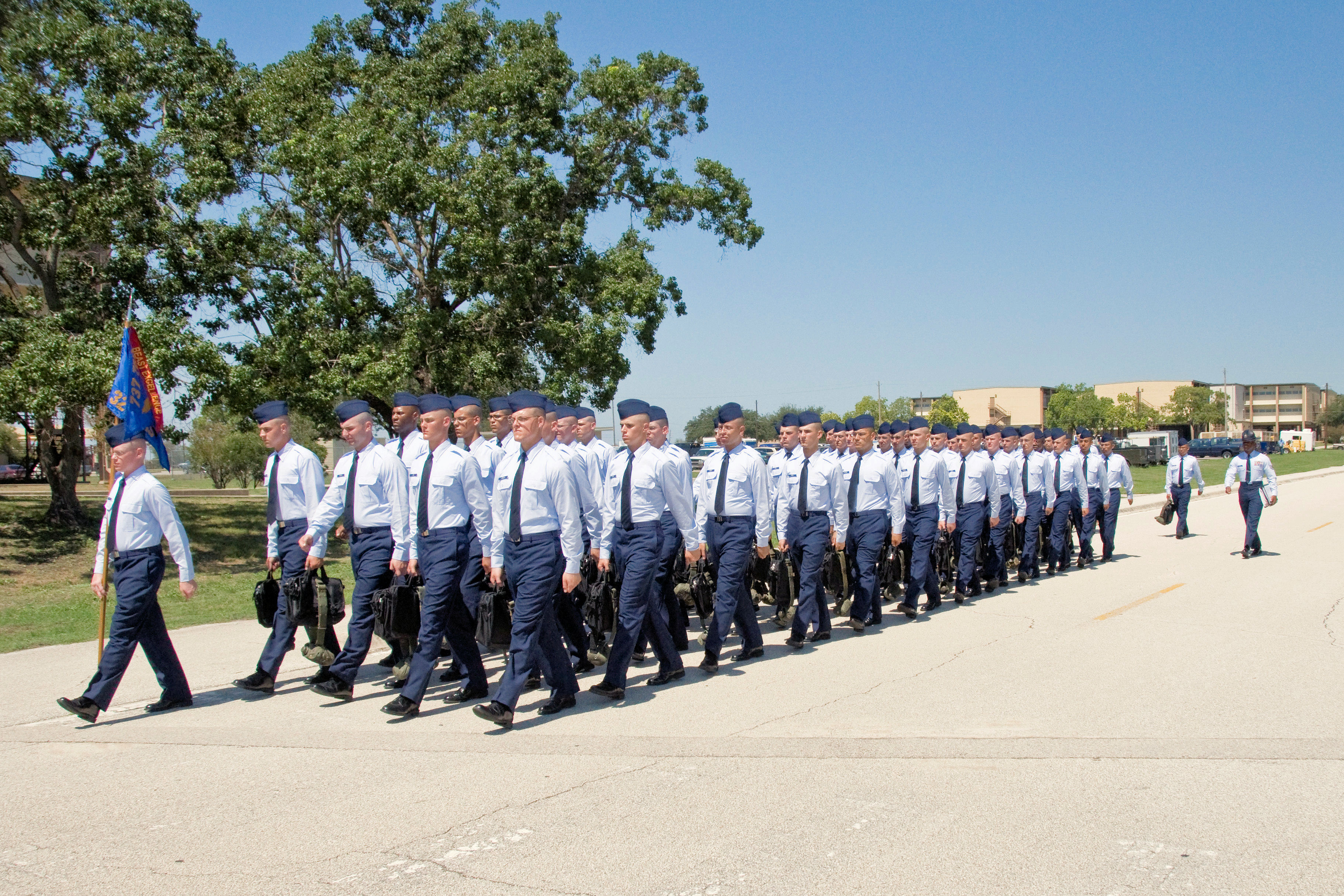
- USAF basic trainees march in formation at Lackland Air Force Base in San Antonio, Texas
- Active: 1953; 1967–1970; 1981–1992; 1993–present
- Country: United States
- Branch: United States Air Force
- Type: Wing
- Role: Training
- Part of: Air Education and Training Command
- Garrison/HQ: Joint Base San Antonio-Lackland, Texas
- Engagements: World War II (American Theater) Vietnam War Operation Just Cause (1989) 1991 Gulf War (Defense of Saudi Arabia; Liberation of Kuwait)

- Decorations: Distinguished Unit Citation Air Force Outstanding Unit Award with Combat "V" Device (2x) Air Force Outstanding Unit Award (6x) Republic of Vietnam Gallantry Cross with Palm (Note: The wing is entitled by temporary bestowal to the honors earned by the 37th Operations Group.)

Commanders
- Current commander: Colonel Kellie S. Courtland
- Deputy Commander: Colonel Timothy A. Turner
- Command Chief: Chief Master Sergeant Caleb Vaden
- Notable commanders: Joseph Ashy; Gabriel P. Disosway

Insignia
- 37th Training Wing emblem (Note: Approved 4 August 1953, reinstated 10 March 1992. Description: Azure, a saltire or.)

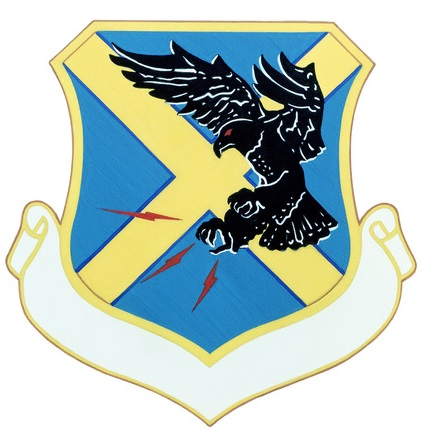
- 37th Tactical Fighter Wing emblem (Note: Approved 23 March 1990.)

The 37th Training Wing is a unit of the United States Air Force assigned to the 2nd Air Force and the Air Education and Training Command. As the host unit to Lackland Air Force Base, Joint Base San Antonio, Texas, the wing is the predominant unit on the installation and is the largest training wing in the USAF. Known as the "Gateway to the Air Force", the 37th Training Wing replaced the Lackland Training Center as the single basic military training for the USAF.

At the same time, the 37th TRW also conducts technical training for security forces, logistics, and professional military education and hosts the English component (DLIELC) of the Defense Language Institute. Its four primary training functions graduate more than 85,000 students annually. Colonel Willie L. Cooper is the Commander of the 37th Training Wing and Caleb Vaden is the Command Chief Master Sergeant.

== Units ==
The 37th Training Wing consists of five training groups and graduates more than 80,000 students annually. These five missions include basic military training of all enlisted recruits entering the Air Force, Air Force Reserve and Air National Guard; technical training encompassing hundreds of courses for a wide array of career fields and functions; Nursing and Health Services Admin officer courses and enlisted medical courses; English language training for international military personnel attending the Defense Language Institute; and specialized maintenance and security training as well as the International Squadron Officer School and International Non-Commissioned Officer Academy conducted in Spanish by active-duty Airmen for Latin American students attending the Inter-American Air Forces Academy.

- 37th Training Wing
  - 37th Training Wing Staff Agencies
  - 37th Training Group USAF Technical School:
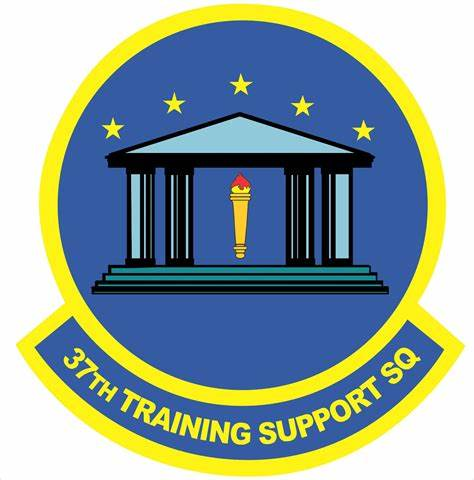
    - 37th Training Support Squadron
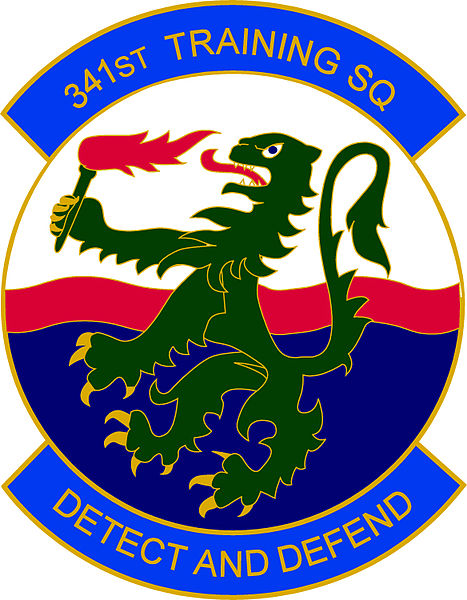
    - 341st Training Squadron Provides trained military working dogs (MWDs) used in patrol, drug and explosive detection, and specialized mission functions for the Department of Defense (DoD) and other government agencies. Conduct operational training of MWD handlers and supervisors. Sustain DoD MWD program through logistical support, veterinary care, and research and development for security efforts worldwide.
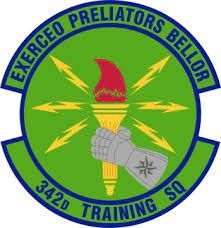
    - 342d Training Squadron Home of all Air Force Battlefield Airman (BA) entry-level training for Pararescue (PJ), Combat Control (CCT), Special Operations Weather (SOWT), and Tactical Air Control Party (TACP).
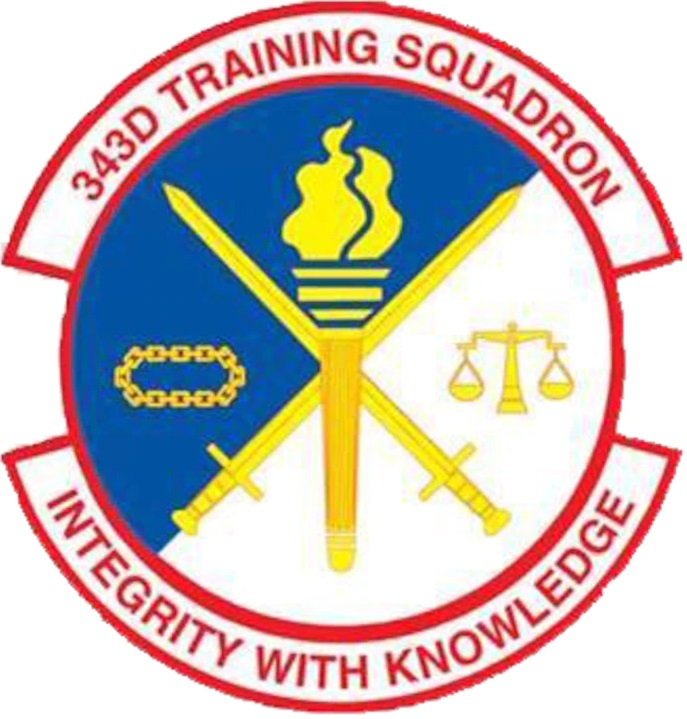
    - 343d Training Squadron Hosts the Air Force's Security Forces Training. Its training areas are housed on Lackland AFB and Camp Bullis, both located in the San Antonio area.
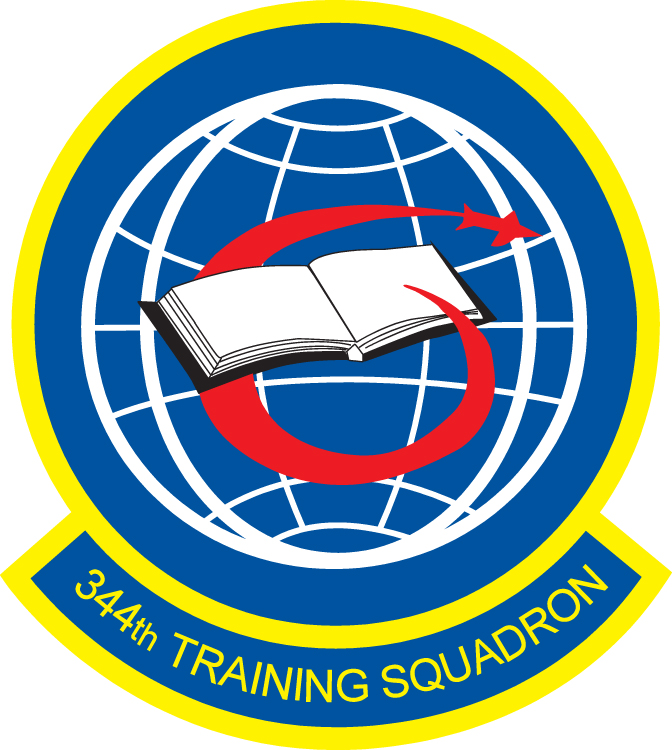
    - 344th Training Squadron Provides technical training for more than 10,000 active duty, Reserve, Guard, international and civilian students annually in Career Enlisted Aviator, Vehicle Maintenance, Logistics Readiness Officer, Logistics Plans, Materiel Management, Contracting, Recruiting, Safety, Cryptological, and TEMPEST courses.
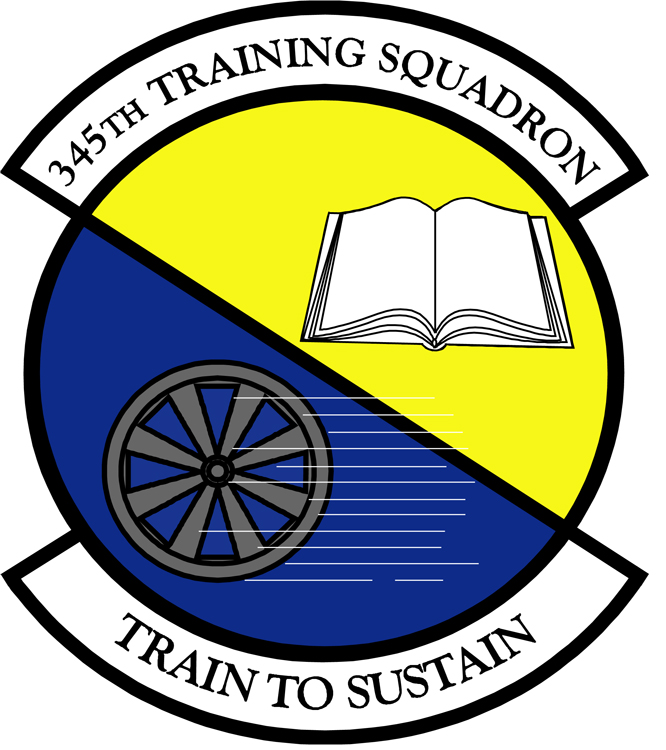
    - 345th Training Squadron Trains, develops and educates technical training students into skilled graduates in the Services, Air Transportation, Hazardous Material Transportation School (HAZMAT) and Traffic Management Office career fields.
  - 737th Training Group USAF Enlisted Basic Training
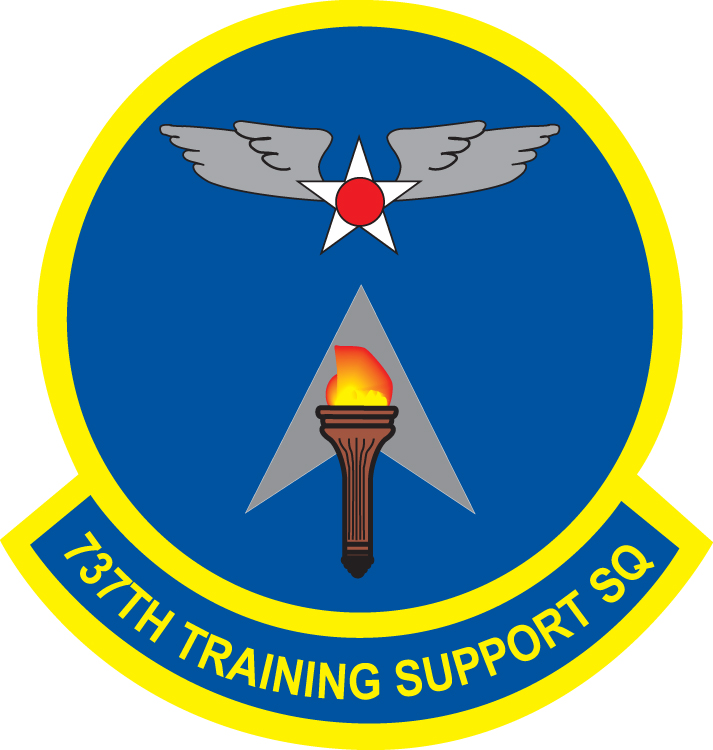
    - 737th Training Support Squadron
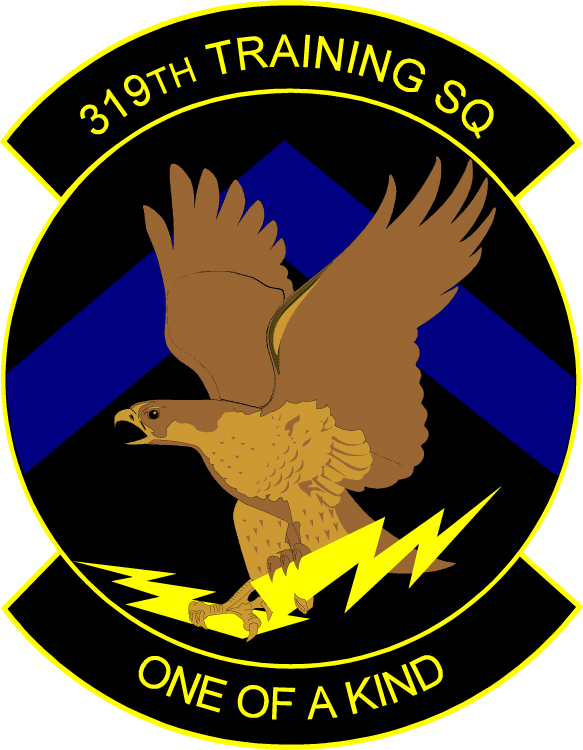
    - 319th Training Squadron
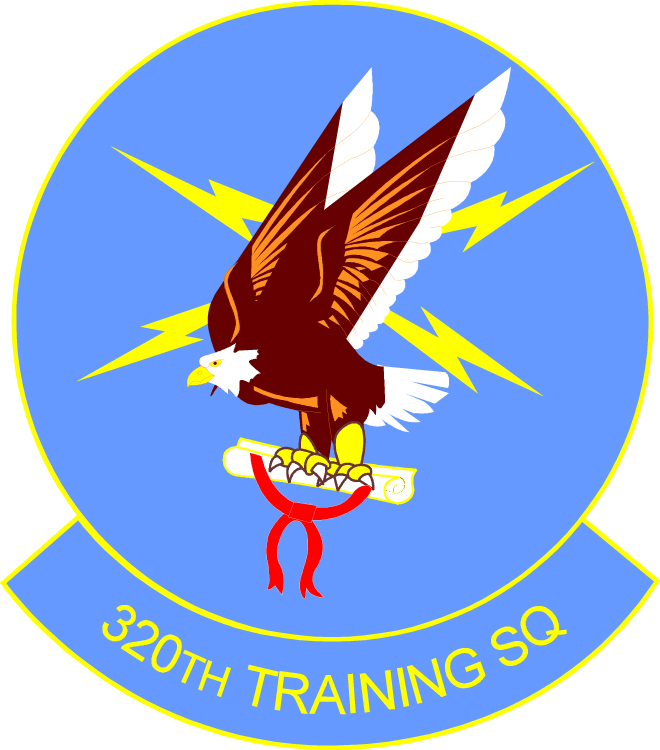
    - 320th Training Squadron
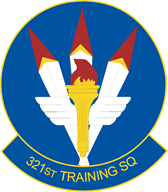
    - 321st Training Squadron
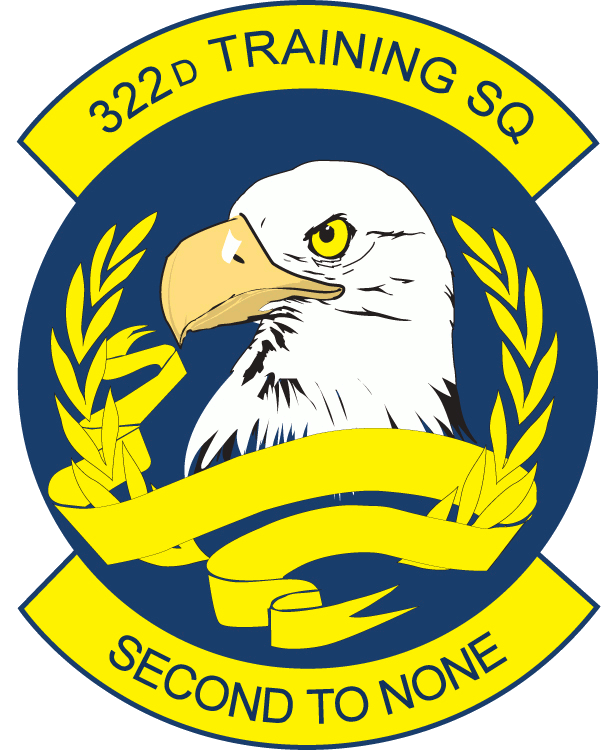
    - 322d Training Squadron
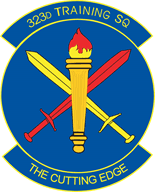
    - 323d Training Squadron
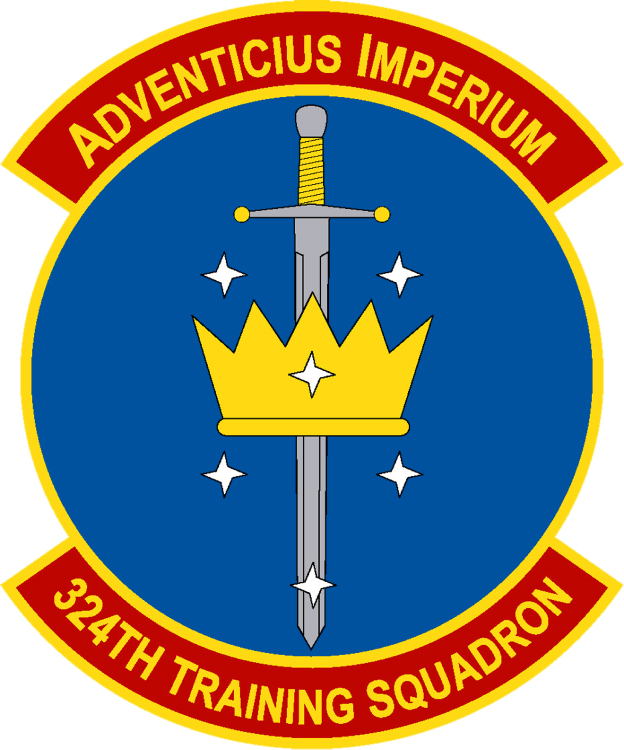
    - 324th Training Squadron
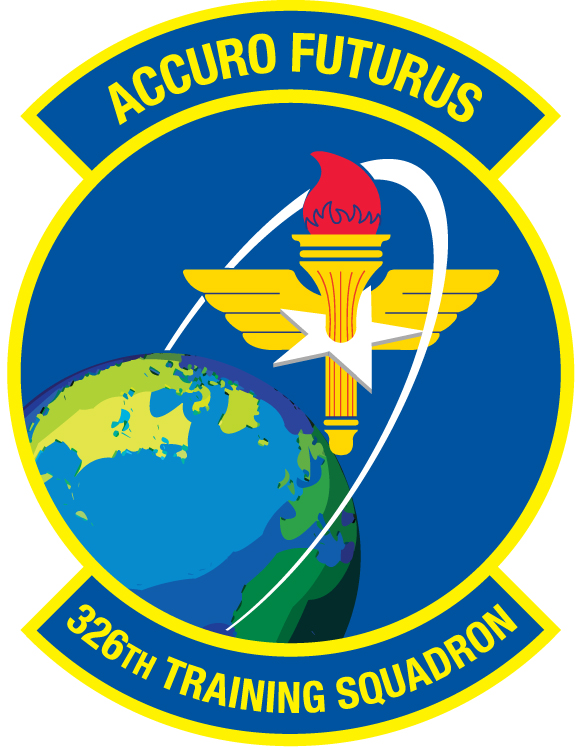
    - 326th Training Squadron
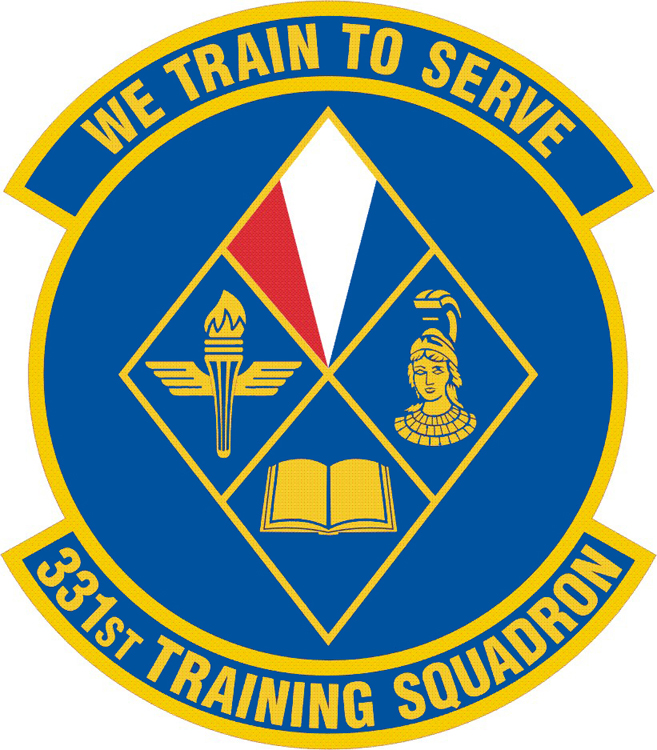
    - 331st Training Squadron
  - Defense Language Institute English Language Center (DLIELC). DLIELC provides world-wide English language training and resident cultural immersion to enable US military and International partners to communicate in support of Department of Defense Security Cooperation objectives.
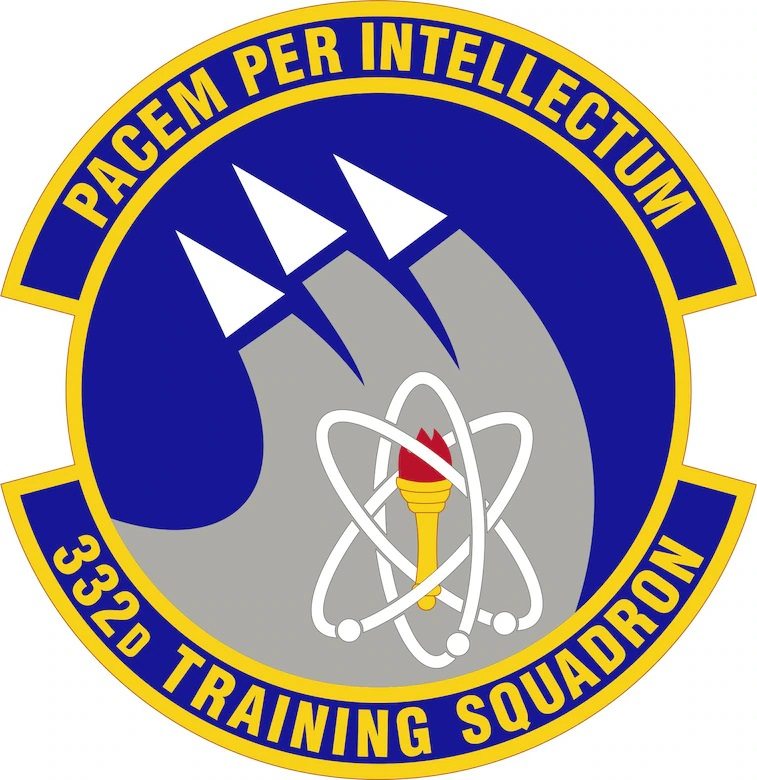
    - 332nd Training Squadron (Academics)
    - 637th International Support Squadron (Operations)
    - 637th Training Support Squadron
  - Inter-American Air Forces Academy (IAAFA). IAAFA is an AETC organization focused on Education, Training, and Security Cooperation. It is the only USAF institution that delivers technical and professional training in Spanish to 32 Partner Nations across the Western Hemisphere. The academy offers a wide range of courses and graduates over 900 students per year.

== History ==
=== Korean War ===
The 37th was established on 3 March 1953 as the United States Air Force 37th Fighter-Bomber Wing as part of the buildup on the Air Force due to the Korean War. It was assigned to Ninth Air Force of Tactical Air Command and was activated on 8 April 1953 at Clovis Air Force Base, New Mexico.

Although activated, the wing was neither manned nor equipped and it was inactivated on 25 June as a result of the Armistice in Korea and the subsequent need for deployment to the war zone being unnecessary.

=== Vietnam War ===
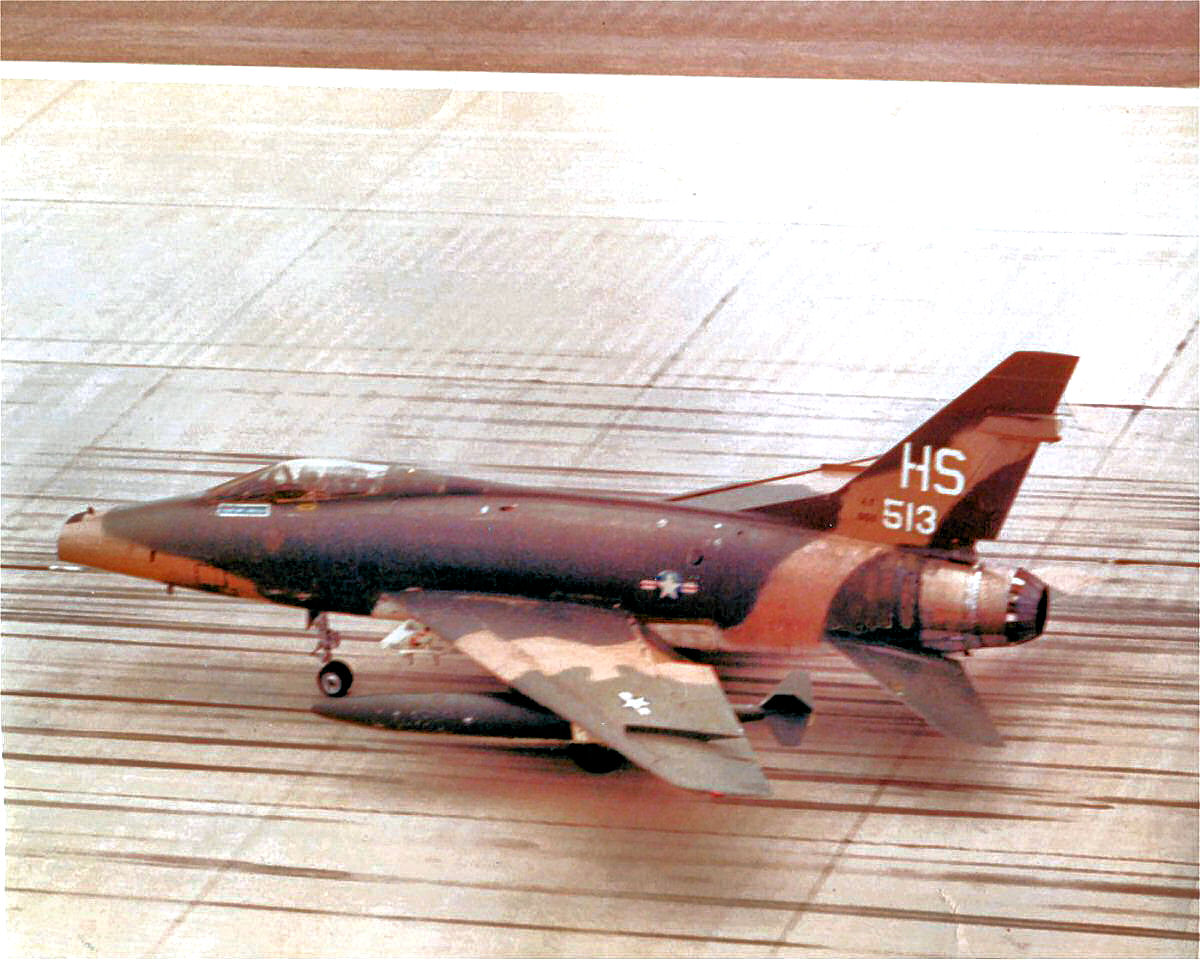
612th TFS F-100D 53-3513 taxiing on the parking apron

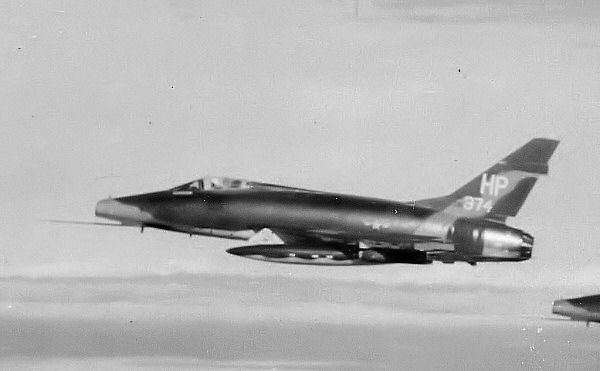
355th TFS North American F-100D-80-NH Super Sabre Serial 56–3374 on a mission into North Vietnam from Phu Cat AB

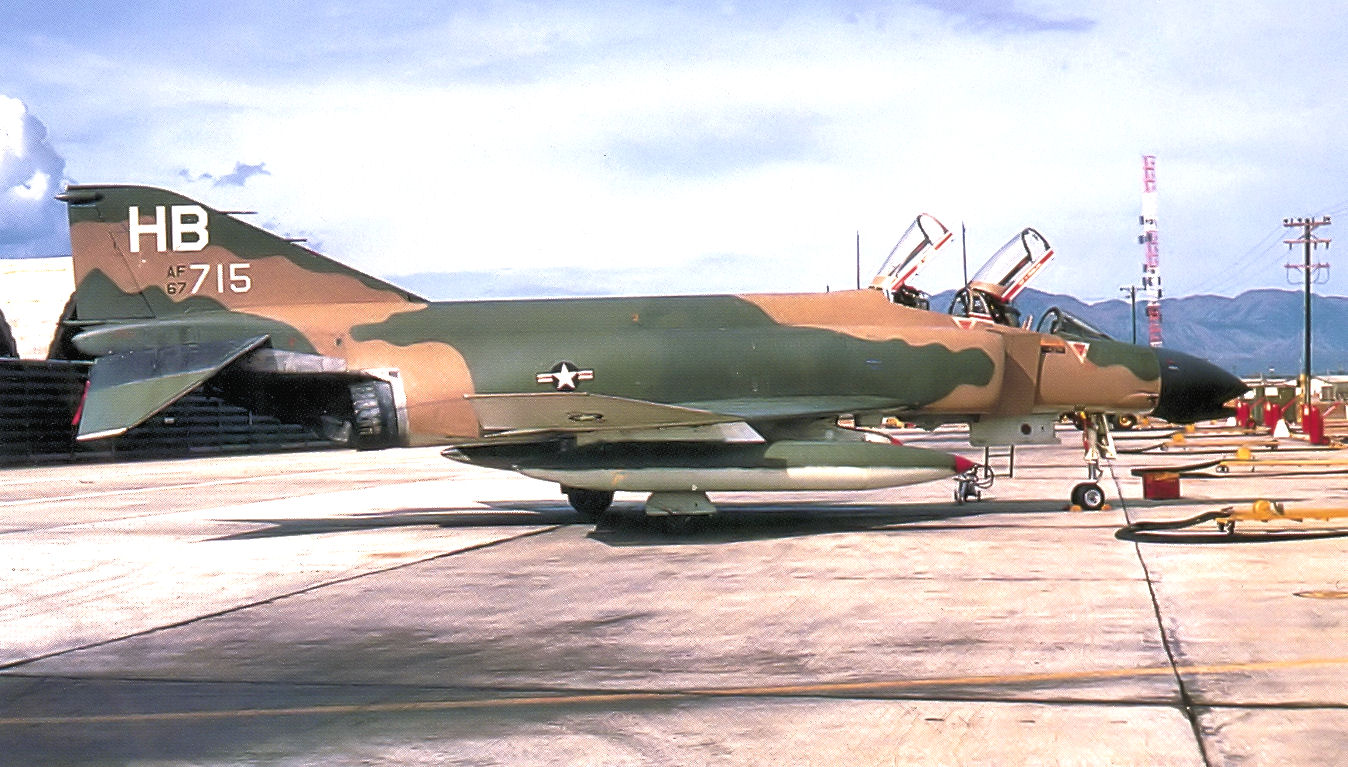
389th TFS McDonnell F-4D-31-MC Phantom 66–7715 at Phu Cat AB, South Vietnam 1969

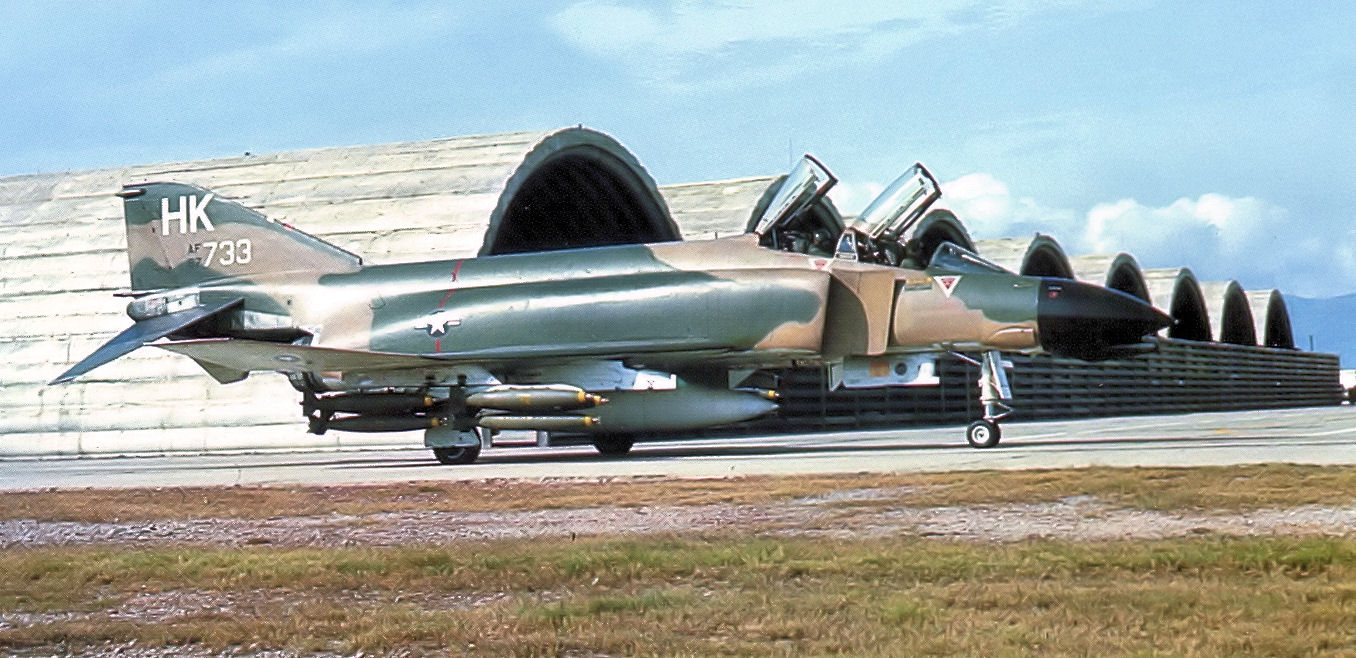
480th TFS McDonnell F-4D-31-MC Phantom 66–7733 at Phu Cat AB, South Vietnam 1969

With the escalation of the Vietnam War in 1965–1966, the Air Force reactivated the unit and redesignated it as the 37th Tactical Fighter Wing and activated it on 26 October 1966. The wing was activated at the newly built Phù Cát Air Base, South Vietnam and it was assigned to Pacific Air Forces. It was organized on 1 March 1967 and assigned to Seventh Air Force. Personnel for the wing headquarters and tactical components were in transit from the United States and elsewhere, and tactical operations did not commence until mid-April.

The 37th Wing was assigned several North American F-100 Super Sabre squadrons, its mission was to provide tactical air power in support of South Vietnamese and United States Army and Marine units engaged in combat against communist forces attempting to overthrow the government of South Vietnam. Initial squadrons assigned were:

- 416th Tactical Fighter Squadron: 15 April 1967 – 27 May 1969 (Note: Transferred from the 3rd Tactical Fighter Wing at Bien Hoa Air Base.) (F-100D/F Tail Code: HE)
- Detachment 1, 612th Tactical Fighter Squadron: 8 June 1967 – 13 April 1969 (Note: Transferred from the 35th Tactical Fighter Wing at Phan Rang Air Base.) (F-100D/F Tail Code: HS)

On 15 April, the 37th began combat operations with strikes by 416 Squadron (F-100D aircraft) en route from Bien Hoa to their new home. On 8 June, Detachment 1 of the 612th Squadron began operations, also after flying a mission en route from their former home at Phan Rang. From June 1967 to May 1969, the 37th also used F-100F two-seat trainers for visual and weather reconnaissance and forward air control operations. The latter mission came to be known as "Fast FAC." Up until this time, the Air Force used slow propeller-driven O-1, O-2 and OV-10 aircraft for this mission. By 28 February 1968, wing squadrons completed 18,000 combat hours and 13,000 combat sorties without a major aircraft accident.

In the spring of 1968, the two squadrons of the wing were augmented by two additional squadrons deployed from the United States. With this augmentation, the wing was then composed of four F-100 combat squadrons with approximately 90 aircraft being assigned.

- 174th Tactical Fighter Squadron: 14 May 1968 – 11 May 1969 (Note: The 174th was federalized along with Air National Guard personnel and aircraft from the 185th Tactical Fighter Group of the Iowa Air National Guard at Sioux City Municipal Airport. (F-100C/F Tail Code: HA))
- 355th Tactical Fighter Squadron: 3 February 1968 – 15 May 1969 (Note: Reassigned from the 354th Tactical Fighter Wing at Myrtle Beach Air Force Base South Carolina.) (F-100D/F Tail Code: HP)

As 355th Squadron personnel completed their TDY that same month the personnel and aircraft returned to Myrtle Beach AFB. They were replaced by Air National Guardsmen from New Jersey and Washington DC, who were manning Myrtle Beach at the time. These newly deployed personnel were sent to Tuy Hoa Air Base along with their F-100 D/F aircraft.

In 1969, the Air Force began withdrawing the F-100 from combat duty in South Vietnam, replacing it with the McDonnell F-4D Phantom II. Two Phantom squadrons were transferred to the 37th from the 366th Tactical Fighter Wing, Da Nang Air Base:

- 480th Tactical Fighter Squadron: 15 April 1969 – 31 March 1970 (F-4D Tail Code: HK)
- 389th Tactical Fighter Squadron: 15 June 1969 – 31 March 1970 (F-4D Tail Code: HB)

The wing continued its combat operations in South Vietnam until 30 March 1970 when it was inactivated as part of the drawdown of American forces in South Vietnam. The wing was replaced by the 12th Tactical Fighter Wing which moved without assets from Cam Ranh Bay Air Base.

During the wing's combat tour in South Vietnam, it was awarded the Presidential Unit Citation, eight Vietnam campaign streamers, two Air Force Outstanding Unit Awards with Combat"V" Device, and the Republic of Vietnam Gallantry Cross with Palm.

=== Tactical Air Command ===
==== George Air Force Base ====
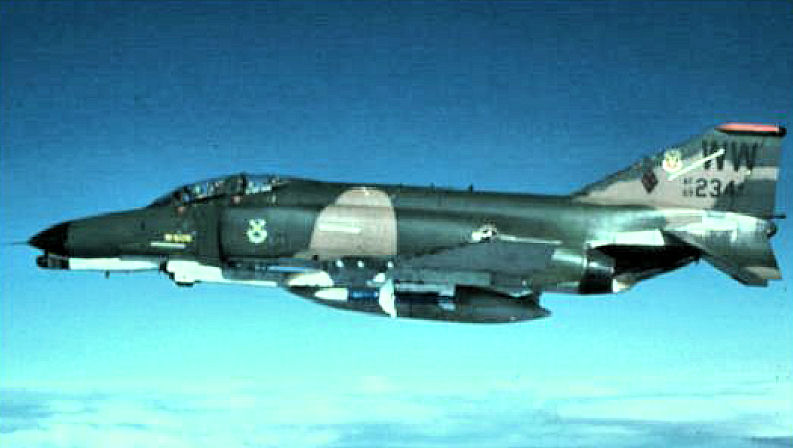
562d Tactical Fighter Training Squadron McDonnell Douglas F-4G Phantom 69-7234

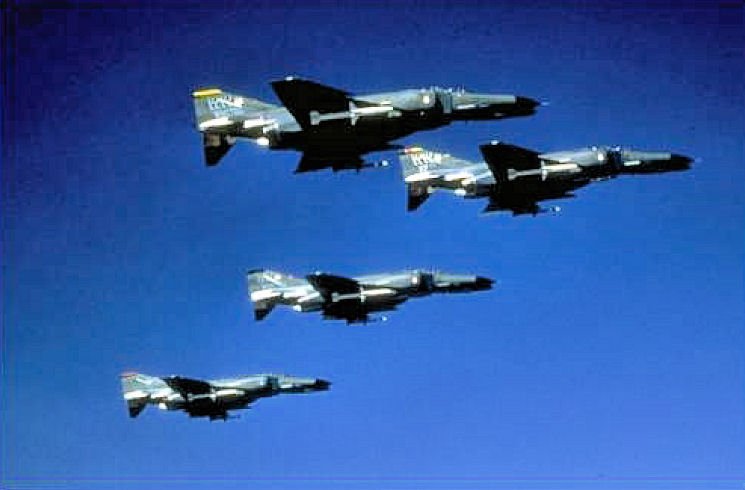
561st Tactical Fighter Squadron – F-4G Phantom II formation, 1982

The 37th was reactivated on 30 March 1981 by Tactical Air Command at George Air Force Base in Victorville, California. Its mission was to provide pilot transition training to the F-4G Phantom II "Wild Weasel" radar suppression aircraft. The mission was transferred to the 37th from the 35th Tactical Fighter Wing, which was TAC's primary F-4E Phantom II training organization in a mission realignment. Both wings were under the TAC's 831st Air Division. Assigned squadrons of the 37th (Tail Code: "WW") at George were:

- 561st Tactical Fighter Squadron: 30 March 1981 – 5 October 1989 (Yellow Tail Stripe)
- 562d Tactical Fighter Training Squadron: 30 March 1981 – 5 October 1989 (Blue Tail Stripe)
- 563rd Tactical Fighter Squadron (red tail stripe)

As the only "Wild Weasel" training wing in the world, it provided instructor pilots and qualified aircrews for the other two "Wild Weasel" wings in the Philippines and West Germany. As part of the training mission, the wing participated in numerous tactical, maritime, and electronic warfare exercises locally and worldwide in hunter/killer tactics, suppression of enemy air defenses, force escort operations and dissimilar air combat training with Air National Guard and Air Force Reserve squadrons, and various allies. Wing aircrews and ground personnel won the United States Air Force Worldwide Fighter gunnery meet in 1985 and 1987.

In 1988, George was scheduled in the first round of base closures passed by Congress under the Base Realignment and Closure program. On 5 October 1989, the 37th turned over its F-4G aircraft to the host 35th Tactical Fighter Wing at George.

==== Tonopah Test Range Airport ====
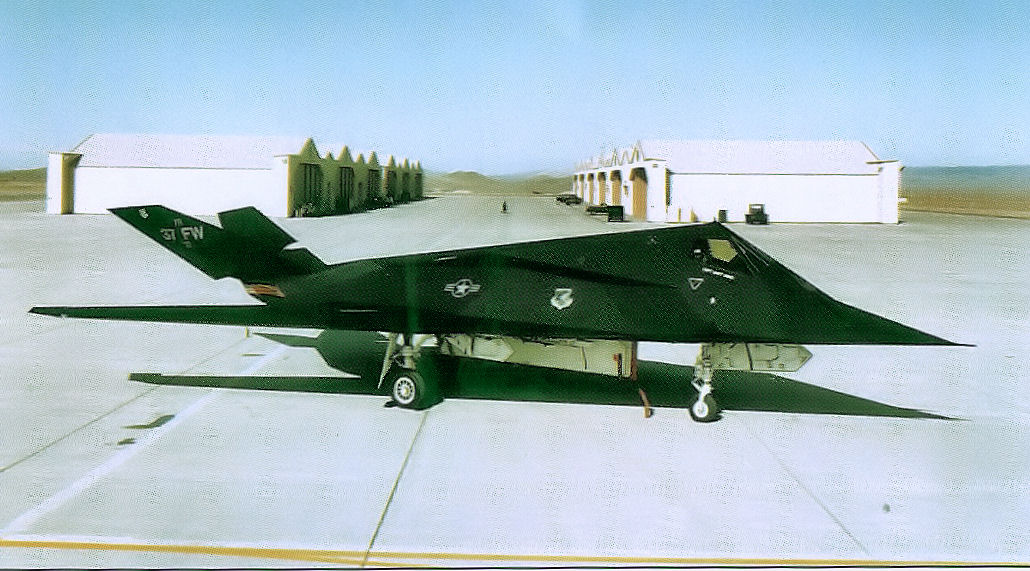
F-117A Nighthawk 84–0827 on the ramp at Tonopah TTR Airport, shortly after the transfer of the 4450th TG to the 37th TFW.

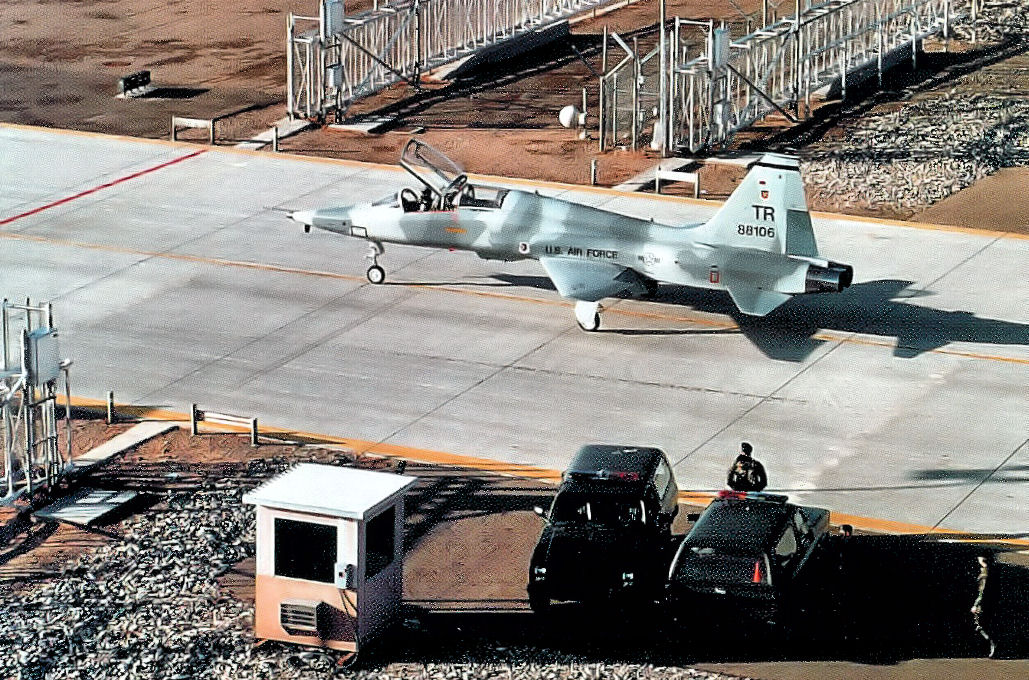
Northrop T-38A-75-NO Talon 68–8016 at Tonopah Test Range Airport

On 10 November 1988, the Air Force officially announced the existence of the Lockheed F-117A Nighthawk to the public. With this announcement, the formerly clandestine Tactical Air Command 4450th Tactical Group, which had transitioned the F-117 from a development to operational weapons system was put on the road to inactivation when the Air Force decided to increase the 4450th TG to a Wing level organization.

As part of the phasedown of operations at George, the 37th Tactical Fighter Wing moved without equipment or personnel to Tonopah Test Range Airport, Nevada on 5 October 1989, and assumed the aircraft, personnel, equipment and mission of the provisional 4450th Tactical Group . As part of the transition from the provisional group to 37th TFW, the F-117A squadrons were inactivated and re-designated as follows:

- 4450th Tactical Squadron; replaced by the 415th Tactical Fighter Squadron (Nightstalkers)
- 4451st Tactical Squadron; replaced by the 416th Tactical Fighter Squadron (Ghostriders)
- 4453d Test and Evaluation Squadron; replaced by the 417th Tactical Fighter Squadron (Bandits)

The uncoded aircraft of the 4450th Group were given the USAF Tail Code of "TR", and subdued squadron emblems were affixed to the 37th TFW's aircraft. The choice of the 415th, 416th and 417th Tactical Fighter Squadrons was significant, as these were all World War II Northrop P-61 Black Widow night fighter squadrons. The mission of the F-117 was night stealth tactical fighter operations; the squadron designations were chosen to honor these pioneering World War II squadrons, which were bestowed their lineages and histories. The wing trained to integrate stealth technology with more conventional methods of combat operations.

The 415th and 416th squadrons each flew 18 production F-117As, whereas the 417th flew the 6 pre-production F-117As (79-10780 – 79–10785). The 417th also operated Northrop T-38A Talon and AT-38B Talon trainers for chase and training.

===== Operation Just Cause =====
On 19 December 1989, just 13 months after the Pentagon had disclosed the existence of the F-117A, it was used in combat for the first time. This was in Operation Just Cause, the invasion of Panama intended to dislodge and arrest General Manuel Noreiga.

In early 1988, Panama's military dictator, Gen. Manuel Noriega, had been indicted by two Florida grand juries on charges of laundering drug money. He laughed off the charges and dismissed Panama's president in February. During the May 1989 presidential election campaign, Noriega's "Dignity Battalion" goon squad beat up opposition candidate Guillermo Endara. Endara won the election, but on 1 October, Noriega prevented him from taking office. Two days later, a coup attempt was made but collapsed when loyalist Panamanian Defense Forces (PDF) rescued Noriega. The coup leaders were executed the following day. On 15 December, Noriega declared a state of war between the United States and Panama. The following evening, PDF soldiers killed a marine lieutenant and arrested a navy lieutenant. The Lieutenant and his wife had witnessed the shooting. The officer was beaten and his wife was threatened with sexual abuse.

In response to these events, President George H. W. Bush issued orders to invade Panama. One of the targets was the Battalion 2000 barracks at Rio Hato Airfield. United States Army Rangers were to be dropped at the adjoining airfield. The PDF troops would have to be neutralized before the airdrop. Army Lt. Gen. Carl W. Stiner, the XVIII Airborne Corps commander, requested F-117As be used. The F-117s would not bomb the two barracks, but rather the 2,000-pound LBGs with time-delay fuses would be directed to aim points near the buildings. They would act as "a giant stun grenade," to confuse the PDF troops without killing them. The use of F-117As was based on their night-bombing accuracy, rather than stealth, as the PDF lacked heavy air defenses.

On the night of 19 December 1989, six F-117As from the 415th TFS took off from TTR Airport. The flight would require five in-flight refuelings. Two of the planes were targeted on Rio Hato Airfield, two more were to provide support for an attempt to capture Noriega, and the final pair were in-flight spares should any of the others suffer malfunctions. As the two F-117As approached the release point, a moment of confusion occurred that would mar their debut. The original plan was for the lead plane to drop its bomb in a field near the barracks on the left, while his wingman would drop his bomb in a field near a barracks on the right. Just before the drop, the wind direction changed. One bomb, intended to land about 100 yards from the 7th Company barracks, actually landed 260 yards away. This was only 18 yards from the 6th Company barracks, which was too close. The other bomb impacted near a basketball court, about 40 yards farther from the barracks than intended.

Despite these problems, the explosions caused the desired confusion. Initial reports spoke of PDF soldiers running around in their underwear, while others threw down their weapons. Several Rangers were killed in the subsequent firefight, but the airfield was taken and U.S. aircraft were landing within two hours.

However, it was revealed three months later that one of the bombs had missed its target by a considerable amount. It seems that there had been some mis-communication in the final stages of the mission planning, and the pilot had been given the wrong coordinates for the target. However, the media jumped on this event and concluded that the F-117A had been a failure on its first mission.

On 21 April 1990, stung perhaps by the press criticism, the Pentagon released more information on the F-117A. More photos of better quality were released, and at Nellis Air Force Base there was a public display of two F-117As.

===== 1991 Gulf War =====
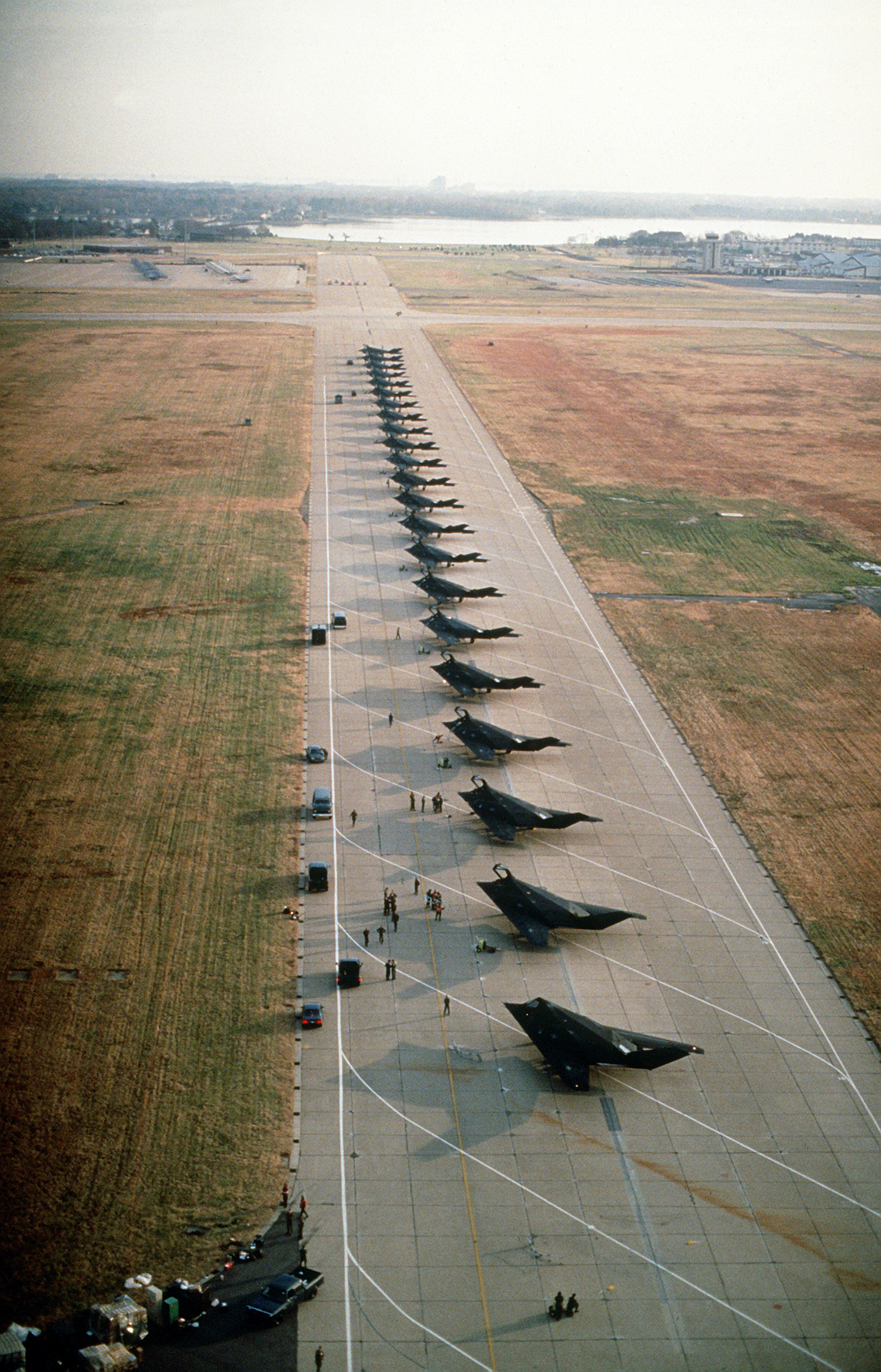
F-117A aircraft from the 37th Tactical Fighter Wing at Langley AFB, Virginia, prior to being deployed to Saudi Arabia for Operation Desert Shield

Less than a year after the wing saw combat in Panama, in response to the Iraqi invasion of Kuwait on 2 August 1990, the 415th Squadron deployed to King Khalid International Airport, Saudi Arabia on 19 August to provide air defense over the Saudi capital of Riyadh.

In November 1990, President Bush ordered United States Central Command to prepare for offensive operations against Iraq after negotiations with President Saddam Hussein of Iraq were at an impasse. The 416th Squadron deployed from Tonopah on 1 December 1990 and in January 1991, a portion of the 417th Squadron also deployed to Saudi Arabia. In spite of the massive Coalition buildup, Saddam Hussein of Iraq refused to withdraw his troops from Kuwait.

In the early morning of 17 January 1991, the United States Central Command Air Forces along with air forces from Coalition nations began an air offensive to remove Iraqi troops from Kuwait. F-117A Nighthawk stealth bombers, flying from Saudi Arabia, were the first aircraft to engage in offensive operations. The stealth technology of the plane allowed it to fly directly to the Iraqi capital of Baghdad without detection. Mission planners had assigned critical strategic Iraqi command and control installations to the F-117s, counting on the aircraft's ability to hit precisely at well-defended targets without being seen or detected by Iraqi air defenses. Other vital targets included key communications centers, research and development facilities for nuclear and chemical weapons, plus hardened aircraft shelters on Iraqi airfields.

On the first night of combat operations, an F-117A dropped a 2000-pound laser-guided GBU-27 Paveway III bomb right through the roof of the general communications building in downtown Baghdad. In another attack on the communications building next to the Tigris River, another GBU-27 Paveway III was dropped through an air shaft in the center of the roof atop the building and blew out all four walls.

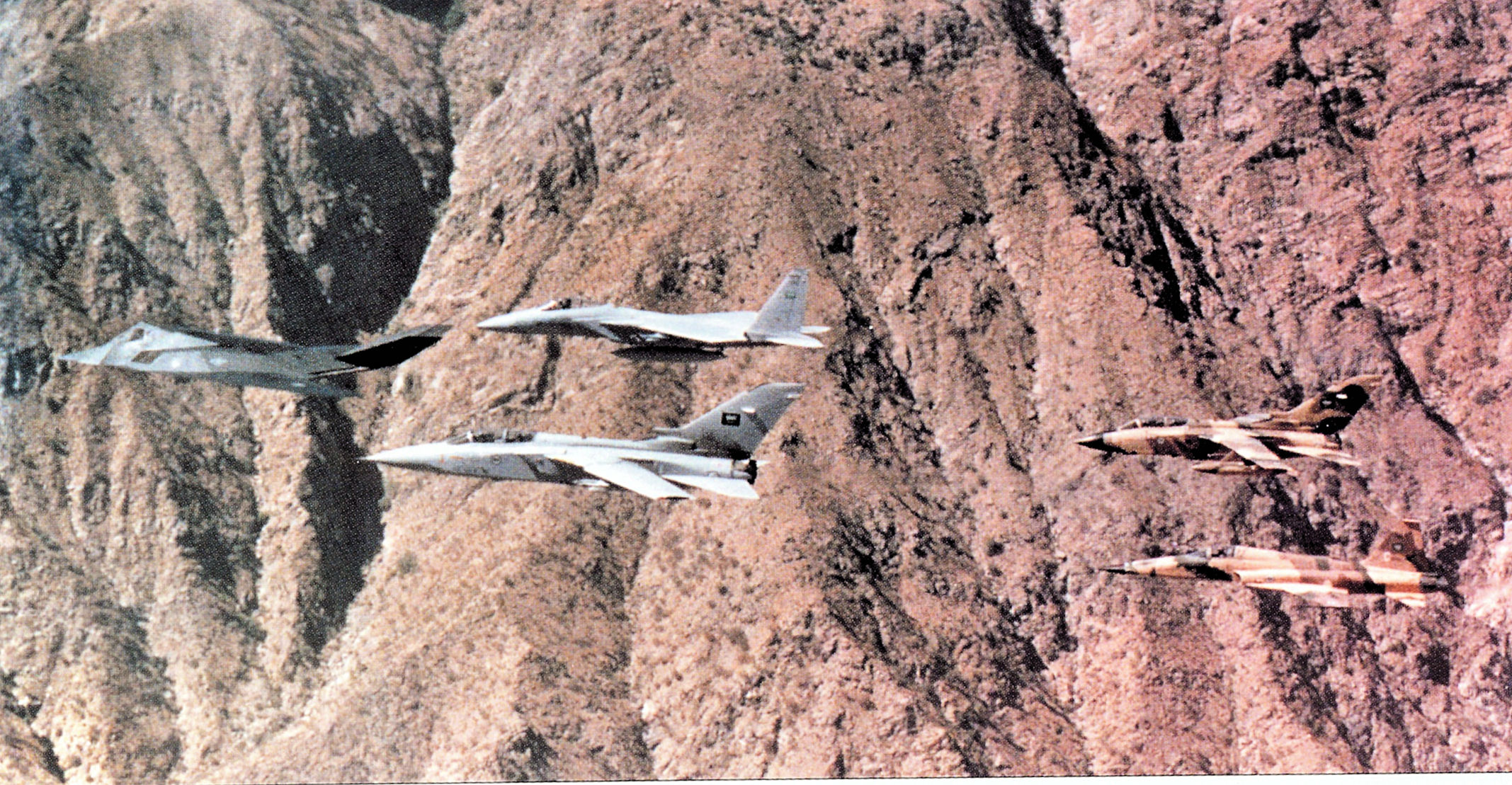
37th Tactical Fighter Wing (Provisional) F-117A Nighthawk leading a formation of Royal Saudi Air Force aircraft over the desert during Operation Desert Storm.

During the first three weeks of the air offensive, F-117As obliterated many hardened targets with unprecedented precision. The 37th TFW flew 1271 combat sorties and maintained an 85.5 percent mission-capable rate. The 43 F-117As of the 37th TFW dropped more than 2000 tons of precision ordnance and attacked some 40 percent of the high-value targets that were struck by the Coalition forces. Not one F-117A was hit, shot down, or lost to mechanical failure.

There is no evidence that the F-117A was ever detected or tracked by Iraqi radar installations, either ground or airborne. After combat operations ceased in February 1991, some wing personnel and aircraft remained on indefinite alert in Saudi Arabia as a component member of the post-Desert Storm task force in Southwest Asia, although most returned to Tonopah by the end of March.

===== F-117 transfer to Holloman AFB =====
After Desert Storm, the 37th transitioned to the Air Force Objective Wing organization, and the 37th Tactical Fighter Wing was redesignated the 37th Fighter Wing on 1 October 1991.

As a result of the end of the Cold War, reduced defense budgets were the order of the day. In reviewing its tactical bases and the costs of maintaining them, It was determined that the operations from Tonopah required considerable logistics support via commercial air and trucking. All military personnel were permanently assigned to Nellis Air Force Base, Nevada, and were transported once each week by air. Also the security requirements of the F-117A had been lessened with its introduction into the Air Force inventory as an operational weapons system. It was determined that a considerable amount of money would be saved by moving the F-117 operations out of the remote site at Tonopah. Tactical Air Command also believed, while Tonopah Airport was adequate for testing and development of aircraft, it was unsuitable as a fully operational tactical base.

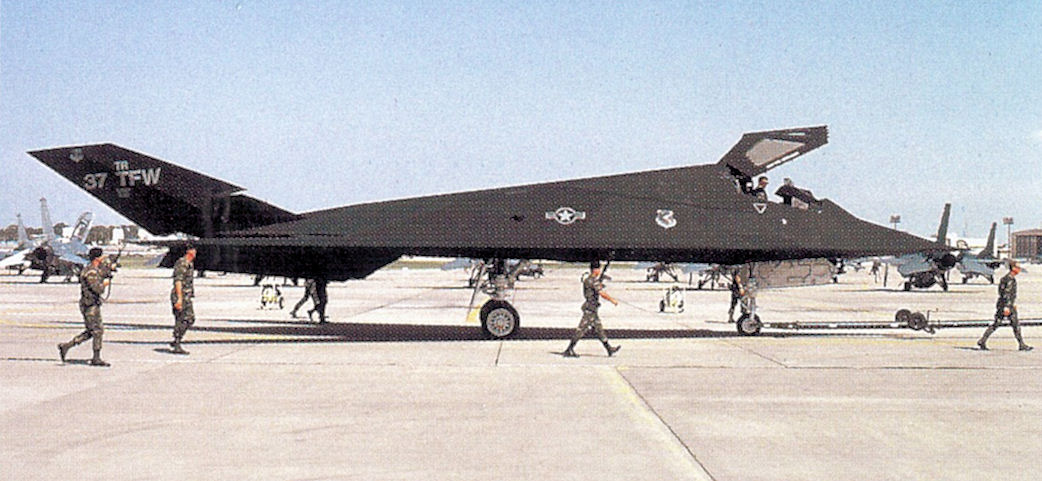
F-117A Nighthawk 85-0830 being towed at Tonopah after its return from Operation Desert Storm, 1991. Note the spotters, the armed security police with M-16s, and tow bar attached to the front landing gear.

Also, the Air Force wanted to retire the F-15A/B Eagles operated by the 49th Fighter Wing at Holloman Air Force Base, New Mexico, most of which were manufactured in the mid-1970s and were costing more and more to operate. As a result, plans were put in place to construct suitable facilities for the F-117A at Holloman and to retire the F-15A/B models of the 49th.

There was also debate about which unit designation would be adopted at Holloman. The 37th was a senior organization to the 49th, and initially it was announced that the 49th would be inactivated and the 37th would become the new host unit at Holloman. This was changed when General Merrill McPeak, USAF Chief of Staff, determined that the 49th had a more notable history than the 37th, would remain active and the 37th would be inactivated.

On 8 July 1992, shortly after the inactivation of Tactical Air Command and the activation of Air Combat Command, the assets of the 37th Fighter Wing were moved to Holloman and was it was inactivated; the aircraft, personnel, equipment and mission being transferred to the 49th Fighter Wing.

=== Air Education and Training Command ===
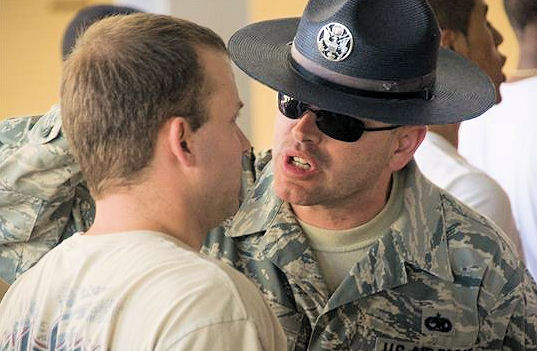
Basic Trainee at Lackland AFB being corrected by a TI with regards to a training issue.

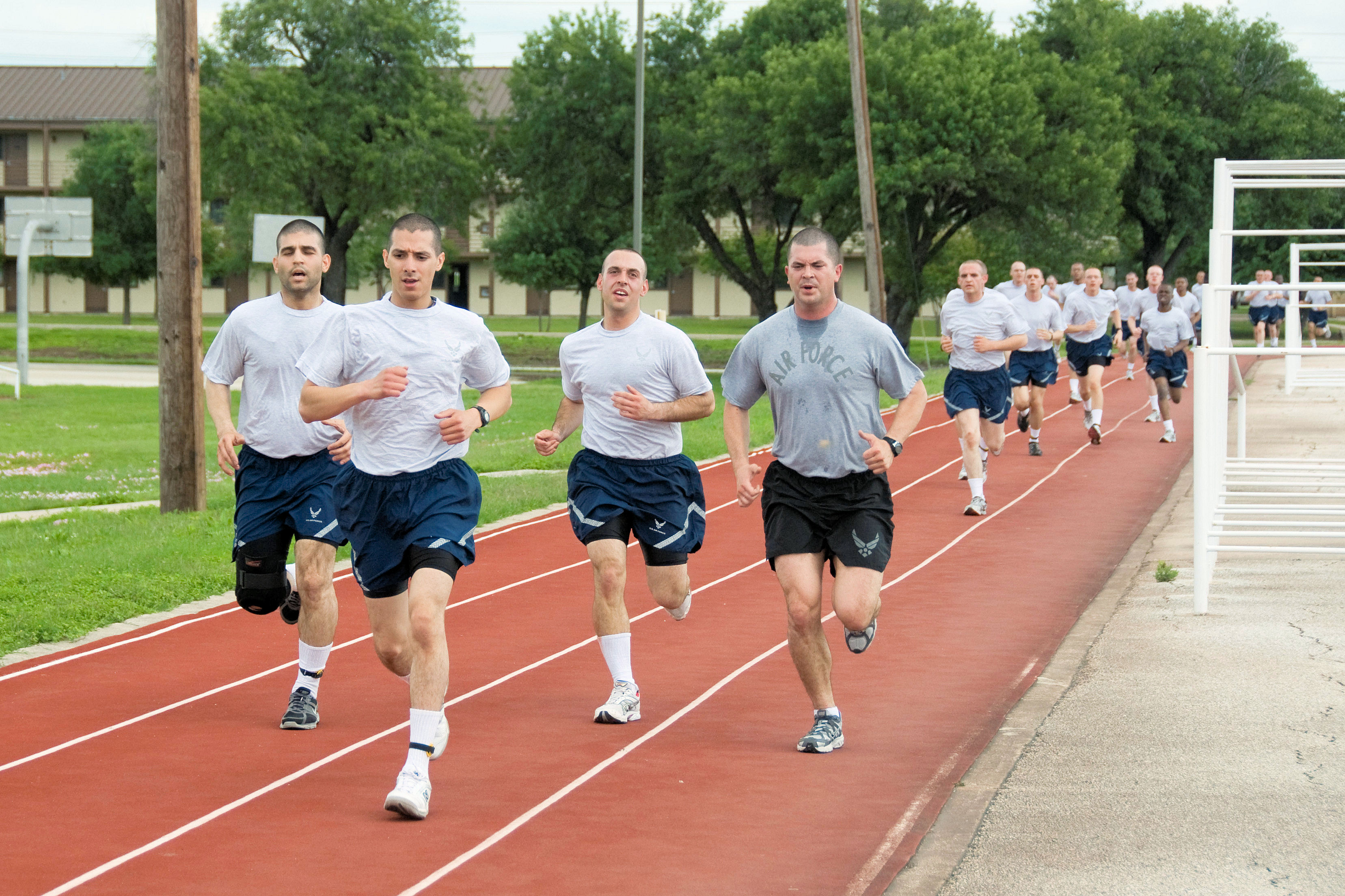
Motivation by the Military Training Instructor assists these seventh week flights to exceed their run times for the final physical training assessment.

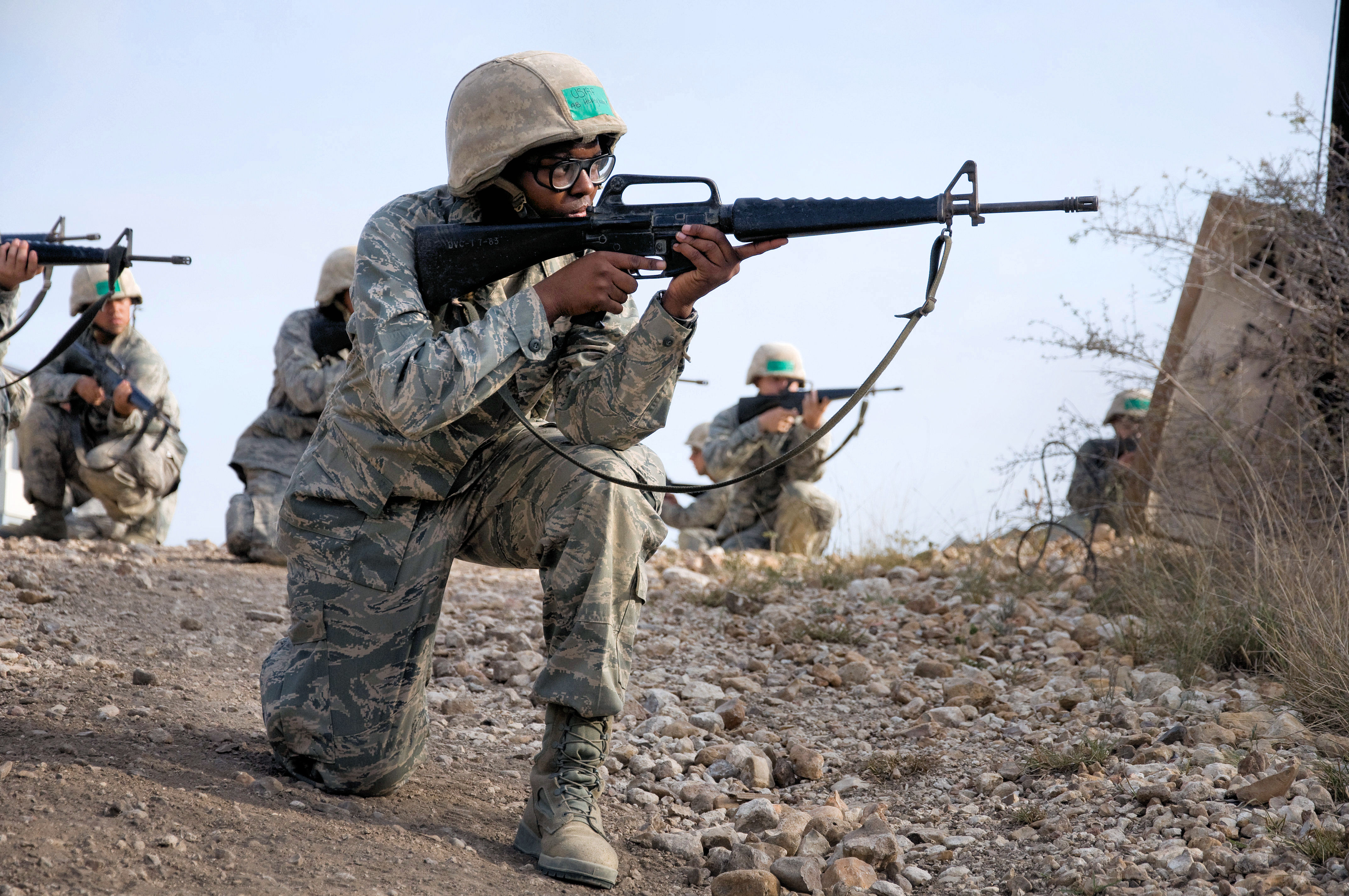
Combat skills training for Airmen

However, the inactivation was of short duration. On 1 July 1993, HQ USAF redesignated Air Training Command as Air Education and Training Command (AETC). At the same time, HQ AETC replaced all of its training centers with numbered wings. As a result, the 37th was redesignated the 37th Training Wing and activated at Lackland Air Force Base, Texas. It replaced the Lackland Training Center and most of its units that had performed the training mission since 1949.

Assigned to the 37th Training Wing were five group-level establishments.

- 37th Technical Training Group
- 37th Military Training Group
- Defense Language Institute English Language Center
- 37th Support Group
- 37th Logistics Group

Additional changes came on 1 April 1994 when HQ USAF redesignated the technical training group as the 37th Training Group and the military training group as the 737th Training Group.

The 37th also inherited a fourth training mission, one which the Lackland Training Center had gained on 2 June 1993, when the Air Force decided to make Lackland the permanent home of the Inter-American Air Forces Academy (IAAFA). The academy had brought its technical training mission to Lackland in August 1992 from the hurricane-wrecked Homestead AFB in Florida. The Inter-American Air Forces Academy had trained officer and enlisted members of various air forces in Latin America since its organization in the Panama Canal Zone on 31 October 1948. On 1 July 1993, IAAFA was reassigned to the 37th Training Wing.

While the wing gained IAAFA's technical training missions, it lost the officer training mission which AETC reassigned to the Air University on 1 July 1993 and shortly thereafter moved to Maxwell Air Force Base, Alabama. The wing also gained extensive technical training courses from two closing bases — Chanute Air Force Base in Illinois and Lowry Air Force Base in Colorado. The courses consisted of much of the Air Force's training for base support and operations. As the new courses began to come on line in 1993, the wing's technical trainee accessions grew significantly. In 1994, technical training entries almost reached 20,000, while basic military training remained at its pre-1986 level of about 35,000. In 1995, the wing reached near parity between basic military and technical training missions in terms of members trained.

In 2016, the 937th Training Group, the Air Force component of the Medical Education and Training Campus located at Fort Sam Houston, was replaced by the 59th Training Group, part of the 59th Medical Wing. The 937th Training Group was reactivated in 2025.

== Lineage ==
- Established as the 37th Fighter-Bomber Wing on 3 March 1953

Activated on 8 April 1953
Inactivated on 25 June 1953

- Redesignated 37th Tactical Fighter Wing and activated on 26 October 1966 (not organized)

Organized on 1 March 1967
Inactivated on 31 March 1970

- Activated on 30 March 1981

Redesignated 37th Fighter Wing on 1 October 1991
Inactivated on 8 July 1992

- Redesignated 37th Training Wing and activated on 1 July 1993

=== Assignments ===
- Ninth Air Force, 8 April – 25 June 1953
- Pacific Air Forces, 26 October 1966 (not organized)
- Seventh Air Force, 1 March 1967 – 31 March 1970
- 831st Air Division, 30 March 1981
- Twelfth Air Force, 5 October 1989 – 8 July 1992
- Second Air Force, 1 July 1993–present

=== Components ===
Groups

- 37th Fighter-Bomber Group (later 37th Operations Group): 8 April – 25 June 1953; 1 November 1991 – 8 July 1992
- 37th Training Group
- 737th Training Group
- 937th Training Group, activated on 15 September 2011; inactivated on 20 January 2016; reactivated on 30 April 2025.

Squadrons

- 174th Tactical Fighter Squadron: 14 May 1968 – 11 May 1969
- 355th Fighter Squadron: attached 3 February – 4 July 1968, assigned 5 July 1968 – 15 May 1969
- 389th Fighter Squadron: 15 June 1969 – 31 March 1970
- 415th Tactical Fighter Squadron: 5 October 1989 – 1 November 1991
- 416th Tactical Fighter Squadron: 15 April 1967 – 27 May 1969; 5 October 1989 – 1 November 1991
- 417th Tactical Fighter Training Squadron (later 417th Fighter Squadron): 5 October 1989 – 1 November 1991
- 480th Tactical Fighter Squadron: 15 April 1969 – 31 March 1970
- 561st Tactical Fighter Squadron: 30 March 1981 – 5 October 1989
- 562d Tactical Fighter Training Squadron: 30 March 1981 – 5 October 1989
- 563d Tactical Fighter Squadron 30 March 1981 – 5 October 1989

Detachment

- Detachment 1, 612th Tactical Fighter Squadron: attached 8 June 1967 – 13 April 1969.

=== Stations ===
- Clovis Air Force Base, New Mexico, 8 April −25 June 1953
- Phu Cat Air Base, South Vietnam, 1 March 1967 – 31 March 1970
- George Air Force Base, California, 30 March 1981
- Tonopah Test Range Airport, Nevada, 5 October 1989 – 8 July 1992
- Lackland Air Force Base (later Joint Base San Antonio–Lackland), Texas, 1 July 1993 – present

=== Aircraft ===
- North American F-100 Super Sabre (1967–1969)
- McDonnell F-4 Phantom II (1969–1970, 1981–1989)
- F-117 Nighthawk (1989–1992)
- Northrop T-38 Talon (1989–1992)

== See also ==
- YGBSM
