= 185th Air Refueling Wing =

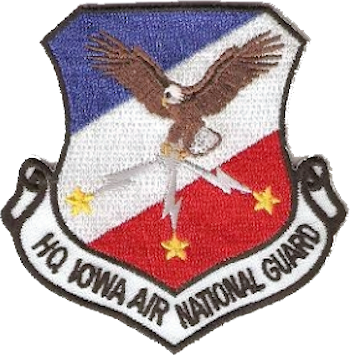
185th Air Refueling Wing

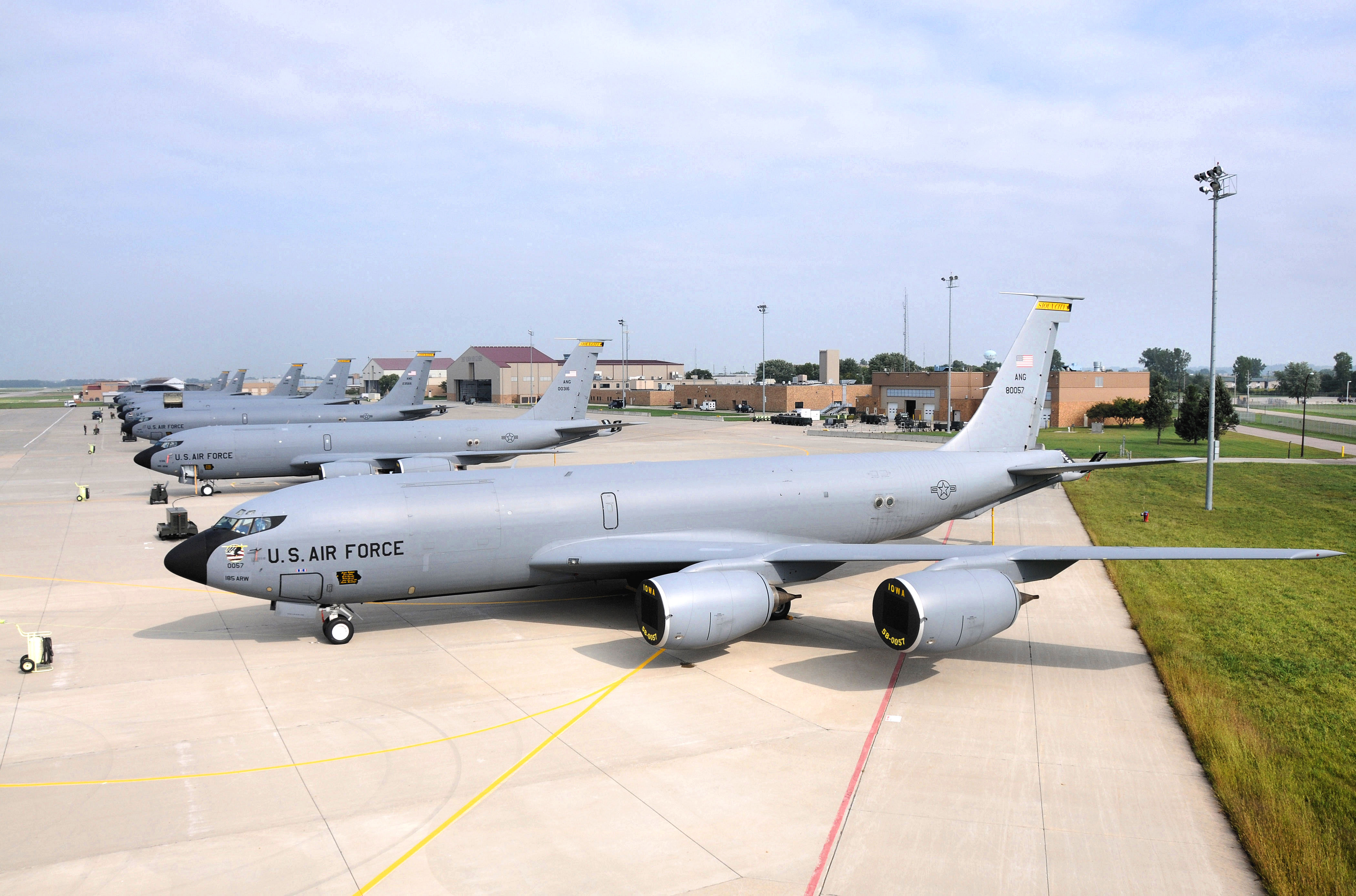
- 185th Air Refueling Wing KC-135R Stratotankers on the ramp at Sioux City Air National Guard Base
- Active: 1962-present
- Country: United States
- Allegiance: Iowa
- Branch: Air National Guard
- Type: Wing
- Role: Aerial refueling
- Size: 900+
- Part of: Iowa Air National Guard
- Garrison/HQ: Colonel Bud Day Field, Sioux City, Iowa

Commanders
- Current commander: Colonel Adam Carlson

Insignia
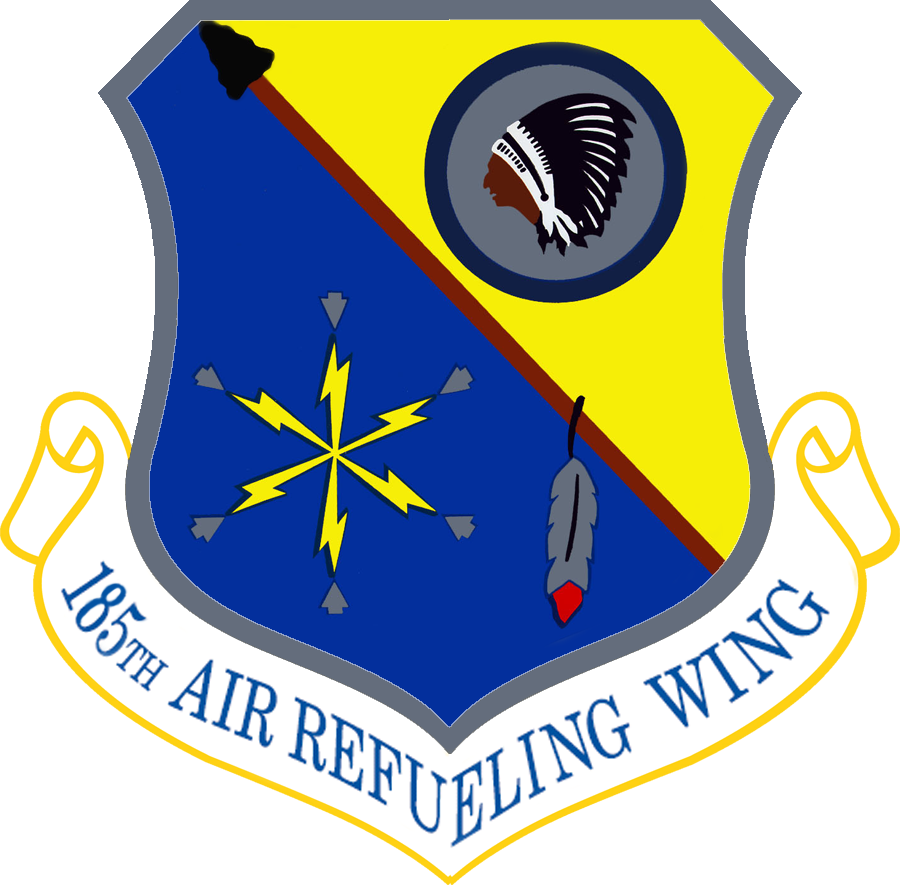
- 185th Air Refueling Wing emblem

- Tail stripe

The 185th Air Refueling Wing is a unit of the Iowa Air National Guard, stationed at Colonel Bud Day Field, Sioux City, Iowa. If activated to federal service, the Wing is gained by the United States Air Force Air Mobility Command.

== Mission ==
The mission of the 185th Wing is to provide air refueling and mobility sustainment in support of the global mission of the Air Force. As a community-based organization the wing and its subordinate units are also tasked to support the state of Iowa in the event of a state emergency.

== Units ==
The 185th Air Refueling Wing consists of the following major units:

- 185th Operations Group
  - 174th Air Refueling Squadron - Boeing KC-135 Stratotanker (174 ARS)
  - 185th Operations Support Flight (185 OSF)
  - 133rd Test Squadron (133 TS) - Geographically Separate Unit at Fort Dodge Regional Airport
  - 185th Intelligence Squadron (185 IS)
- 185th Mission Support Group (185 MSG)
  - 185th Mission Support Flight (185 MSF)
  - 185th Civil Engineer Squadron (185 CES)
  - 185th Security Forces Squadron (185 SFS)
  - 185th Force Support Squadron (185 FSS)
  - 185th Logistics Readiness Squadron (185 LRS)
  - 185 Communications Flight (185 CF)
- 185th Maintenance Group
  - 185th Aircraft Maintenance Squadron (185 AMXS)
  - 185th Maintenance Squadron (185 MXS)
  - 185 Maintenance Operations Flight (185 MOF)
- 185th Medical Group (185 MDG)

== History ==
The wing was first organized on 1 October 1962 as the 185th Tactical Fighter Group as a single headquarters for the 174th Tactical Fighter Squadron and its support units. This reorganization nearly doubled the authorized personnel of the Air National Guard at Sioux City Municipal Airport to over 800 officers and airmen. This era would also mark the longest continuous period the group flew one model aircraft. The 185th flew the North American F-100 Super Sabre from its establishment until 1977, a period of 15 years.

=== Vietnam era ===
On 26 January 1968, the 185th was called to active Federal service as a result of the Pueblo Crisis. During its active duty period, the group moved to Cannon Air Force Base, New Mexico, but became little more than a paper unit. Its 174th Tactical Fighter Squadron, augmented by other personnel from the group, deployed with their F-100s to Phù Cát Air Base, South Vietnam on 11 May 1968 where it was assigned to the 37th Tactical Fighter Wing. During the course of the next 90 days, the balance of the 185th was deployed to six military bases in South Korea and others in the United States. During its year in South Vietnam, the 174th flew 6,539 combat sorties totaling 11,359 hours of combat time. The unit was awarded the Presidential Unit Citation and the Air Force Outstanding Unit Award. Individually, its members were awarded 12 Silver Stars, 35 Distinguished Flying Crosses, 30 Bronze Star Medals, 115 Air Force Commendation Medals, 325 Air Medals, and 1 Purple Heart.

While at Phù Cát, one pilot that flew one of the 174th's planes was Dick Rutan. Dick went on to become the first pilot to take a non-stop unrefuelled trip around the world. Dick was also one of the Misty FACs, a top-secret squadron that flew high-risk missions during their tours. Another member of this famous squadron was Medal of Honor recipient Colonel George "Bud" Day, for whom the airfield in Sioux City is named.

All personnel and aircraft were released from active duty in May 1969 and returned to Sioux City. Vietnam also spawned the nickname Bats. The "Bat" depicted on the tails of the aircraft and the shoulder patch of the pilots became a legendary symbol of the 185th when its 174th Tactical Fighter Squadron was called to duty in Vietnam. "Bat" was the call sign of the 174th. The other symbol often associated with the squadron has been the Indian Chief that is part of the unit patch as well as part of the paint work on the aircraft.

=== A-7D Corsair IIs ===
In 1977, the 185th converted to the LTV A-7D Corsair II. While flying the A-7Ds, the unit won the Spaatz Trophy for the second time in 1990, recognizing them as the best Air Guard unit in the country. The Unit also was awarded the Air Force Outstanding Unit award five times; in 1985, 1986, 1987, 1989 and in 1991. In addition, the 185th's Logistics Group was a two-time winner of the Daedalian Trophy which recognizes the best maintenance team in the Aior Guard. In 1989, the 185th won the Twelfth Air Force A-7 gunnery meet for the second time. Also in 1989, the 185th received the Gunsmoke A-7 Maintenance Team Award for its aircraft.

=== Expansion to wing ===
185th Fighter Wing F-16A Fighting Falcon on display at Oshkosh, sporting a 50th Anniversary scheme, 1996.

On 19 December 1991, the group received General Dynamics F-16 Fighting Falcons. On 16 March 1992, the 185th Tactical Fighter Group was redesignated the 185th Fighter Group. One month later, the unit was rated operational with the Fighting Falcon. As the Air Force and Air Guard standardized unit structures under the Objective Wing concept, the 185th was designated the 185th Fighter Wing. The F-16 Fighting Falcon would be the last jet that the unit would fly before conversion to KC-135E tankers in 2003. The 185th continued to be an award-winning unit. In 1994, the unit gained the Winston P. Wilson Award as well as the Air Force Association Outstanding Air National Guard Unit Award. In 1999, Congress appropriated $6.5 million for the Air National Guard Aircraft Paint Facility located on base.

The wing was redesignated the 185th Air Refueling Wing. In November 2003, the first all Sioux City crew flew a Boeing KC-135 Stratotanker out of Sioux City. Within a year, the 185th was flying refueling missions from Geilenkirchen, Germany supporting Airborne Warning and Control System aircraft of the North Atlantic Treaty Organization. In 2007, the 185th began transitioning from the KC-135E to the KC-135R model.

Today, the 185th consists of nearly 900 members that include traditional guardsman, full-time military, air technicians and state contract employees.

=== Operations and decorations ===
- Spaatz Trophy (1990)
- Presidential Unit Citation (1968)
- Air Force Outstanding Unit Award (1968, 1985, 1986, 1987, 1989, 1991, 2008, and 2009)
- 185th Logistics Group-Daedalian Trophy (2-time winner)
- Winston P. Wilson Award (1994)
- Air Force Association Outstanding Air National Guard Unit Award (1994)

== Lineage ==
- Established as the 185th Tactical Fighter Group on 11 September 1962

Organized on 1 October 1962
Ordered into active service on 26 January 1968
Relieved from active duty and returned to the control of the state of Iowa on 28 May 1969
Redesignated 185th Fighter Group on 16 March 1992
Redesignated 185th Fighter Wing on 1 May 1992
Redesignated 185th Air Refueling Wing on 1 November 2003

=== Assignments ===
- 140th Tactical Fighter Wing, 1 October 1962
- 832d Air Division, 26 January 1968
- 140th Tactical Fighter Wing, 29 May 1969
- 132d Tactical Fighter Wing 1 June 1969
- Iowa Air National Guard, 16 March 1992 – Present

Mobilization gaining commands
Tactical Air Command, 1 October 1962
Air Combat Command, 1 June 1992
Air Mobility Command, 1 November 2003 – present

=== Components ===
- 185th Operations Group, 1 June 1992 – Present
- 185th Logistics Group (later 185th Maintenance Group), 1 June 1992 – Present
- 185th Support Group (later 185th Mission Group), 1 June 1992 – Present
- 174th Tactical Fighter Squadron (later 174th Fighter Squadron), 1 October 1962 – 26 January 1968; 29 May 1969 – 1 June 1992

=== Stations ===
- Sioux City Municipal Airport, 1 October 1962
- Cannon Air Force Base, 26 January 1968
- Sioux City Municipal Airport (Later Sioux City Air National Guard Base, also Colonel Bud Day Field), 29 May 1969 – present

=== Aircraft ===
- North American F-100C Super Sabre (1962–1977)
- LTV A-7D Corsair (1977–1991)
- General Dynamics F-16 Fighting Falcon (1992–2002)
- Boeing KC-135E Stratotanker (2002–2007)
- Boeing KC-135R Stratotanker (2007 – present)
