= 174th Air Refueling Squadron =

Iowa Air National Guard unit

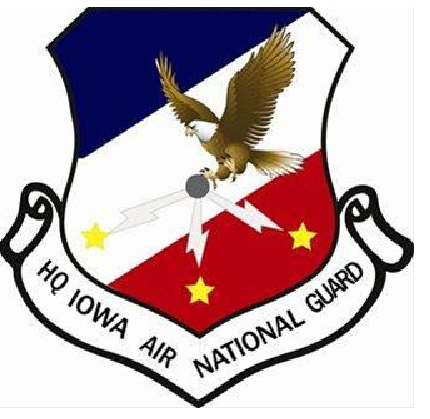
174th Air Refueling Squadron

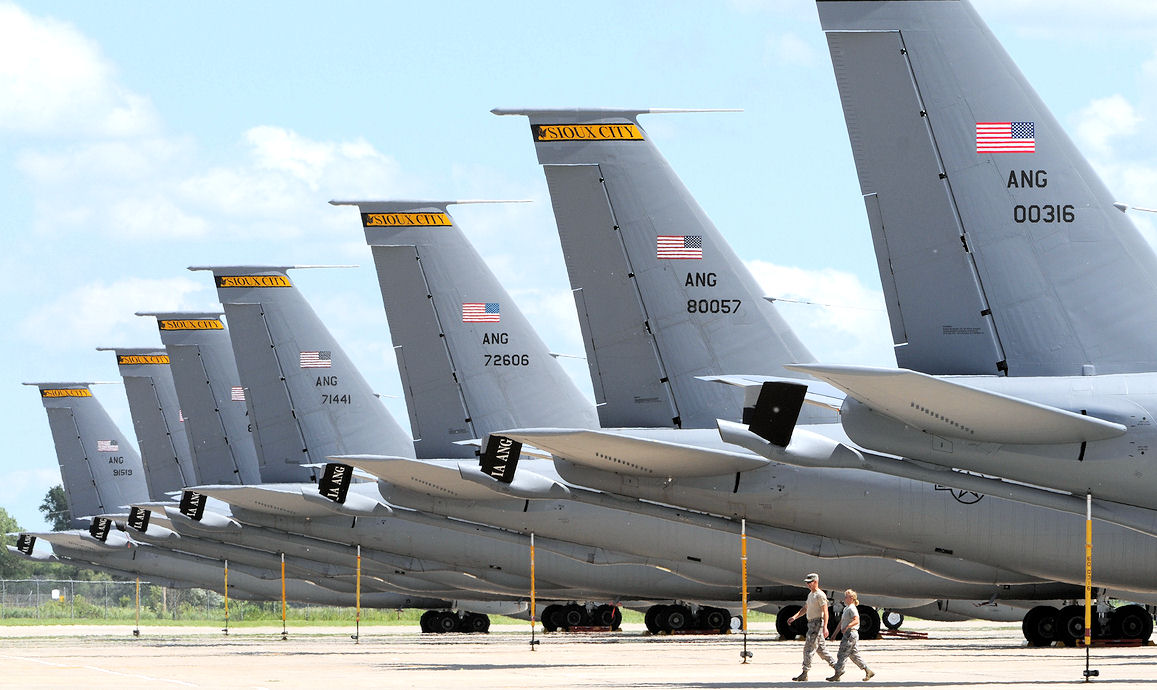
- 174th Air Refueling Squadron – KC-135R Stratotankers at Sioux City AGB IA
- Active: 1943 – present
- Country: United States
- Allegiance: Iowa
- Branch: Air National Guard
- Type: Squadron
- Role: Aerial refueling
- Part of: Iowa Air National Guard
- Garrison/HQ: Sioux City Air National Guard Base, Iowa
- Nickname: "Bats"
- Engagements: European Theater of Operations
- Decorations: Distinguished Unit Citation Air Force Outstanding Unit Award Belgian Fourragère

Insignia
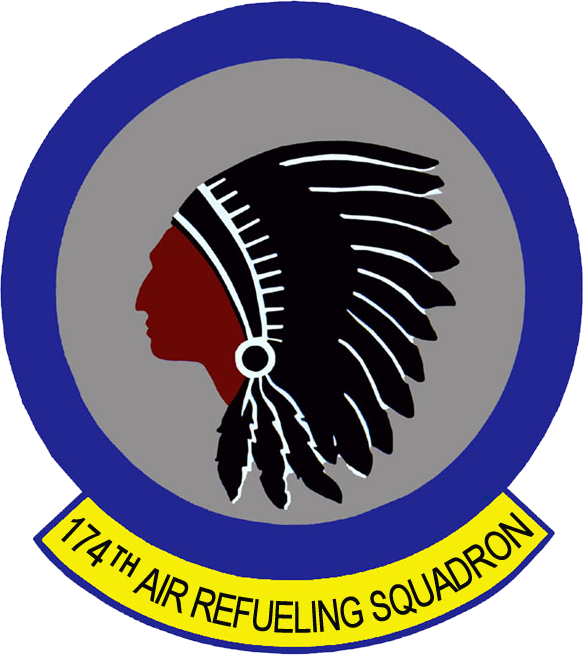
- 174th Air Refueling Squadron emblem

- Tail stripe

The 174th Air Refueling Squadron is a unit of the Iowa Air National Guard 185th Air Refueling Wing. It is assigned to Sioux City Air National Guard Base, Iowa and is equipped with the Boeing KC-135R Stratotanker aircraft.

== History ==
=== World War II ===
Established on 27 April 1943 at Richmond Army Air Base, Virginia, as the 386th Fighter Squadron, equipped with Republic P-47 Thunderboltss. Deployed to the European Theater of Operations (ETO), and assigned to Ninth Air Force in England. Arrived at RAF Gosfield, Essex on 23 December 1943. Their first combat air field training resumed for two months. On 22 February 1944, the squadron flew their first combat mission and over the next one to two months gradually converting from escorting Eighth Air Force heavy bombers to their fighter-bomber mode under Ninth Air Force that continued to the war's end.

The squadron was instrumental in determining the maximum bomb loads for the P-47. Two one-thousand pound bombs and an external fuel tank on the Billy Rack. They were the first group to fly a dive-bombing mission with that bomb load. Their firepower was eight fifty caliber machine guns and their total arsenal included rockets and napalm. This armament was standard for all thirteen P-47 fighter-bomber groups shortly after the D-Day Invasion on 6 June 1944.

Assigned to the IX Tactical Air Command, the squadron flew in direct support of General Hodges First Army. Their mission was two-fold. Protect the ground forces from enemy air attack and destroy any and all obstacles on the ground that prevented our forces from advancing. On two occasions to support Patton's Third Army. The first was shortly after 1 August 1944. The second was during the last months of the Battle of the Bulge. The squadron was active against specific targets on D-Day before, during and following. This was the first company breakthrough in the Battle of the Bulge in taking Germany. The squadron was part of the first group to move into Germany on 17 March 1945 at Aachen and the first to fly a combat mission off a German soil.

The 386th Fighter Squadron flew combat from 22 February 1944 through 4 May 1945, totalling 14.5 months. They flew combat from eleven air fields or air strips moving more times than any other fighter-bomber group in the Ninth Air Force.

=== Iowa Air National Guard ===
Was transferred to the new Iowa Air National Guard in May 1946 and became a North American P-51D Mustang squadron, receiving federal recognition on 23 August 1946, one of the first Air National Guard squadrons activated. Assigned to Sioux Gateway Airport, a former training field during World War II used to train B-17 Flying Fortress aircrews. Was assigned to the Iowa ANG 132d Fighter Wing, which consisted of the 124th, along with the 123d Fighter Squadron at Des Moines, and the Nebraska ANG 173d Fighter Squadron at Lincoln, Nebraska. The initial component of the unit included 9 rated officers, 7 non-rated officers, and 46 enlisted members for a total of 62 members. Today, the 185th consists of nearly 1,000 traditional and full-time military members as well as over 300 air technicians and state contract employees. Engaged in routine training exercises, and was upgraded to Republic F-84B Thunderjet jet aircraft in early 1948.

==== Korean War federalization ====
Activated to Federal Service during the Korean War, sent to Dow Air Force Base, Maine Used by TAC to train replacement pilots in F-51D Mustang ground support operations, also deployed unit members to Japan and Korea to fly combat missions. The 132d was moved to Alexandria Air Force Base, Louisiana in May 1952 again with F-51s replacing the federalized Oklahoma ANG 137th Fighter-Bomber Wing which was deployed to France. Performed training as a tactical fighter unit until relieved from active service and returned to Iowa ANG jurisdiction in January 1953.

==== Cold War ====
In July 1953, the unit converted from the F-51D to the Lockheed F-80C Shooting Star.

In 1955, the 174th FS was reassigned to Air Defense Command and redesignated the 174th Fighter-Interceptor Squadron and transitioned to the Republic F-84E Thunderjet. As a component of the 132d Fighter Interceptor Wing, the unit won the ANG Gunnery Meet. They also placed third in the USAF Fighter Weapons meet that year. For their accomplishments, the 174th was awarded the Spaatz Trophy as the most outstanding Air National Guard squadron in the US in 1956. The unit also was awarded the Wing Flying Safety trophy that year as well.

In 1958, the unit changed aircraft and its primary mission. It was redesignated the 174th Tactical Reconnaissance Squadron, flying the Republic RF-84F Thunderflash. As a reconnaissance unit, the 174th was awarded the top "Operational Readiness Reconnaissance Unit" in the US in 1960. In 1961, the unit was re-designated the 174th Tactical Fighter Squadron and converted to flying nuclear-capable North American F-100C Super Sabre aircraft. The squadron flew the F-100 from 1961 until 1977, a period of 16 years.

On 26 January 1968, the squadron was recalled to active Federal service as a result of the Pueblo Crisis. The 174th Tactical Fighter Squadron, augmented by many of the other group personnel deployed with their F-100s to Phu Cat Air Base, South Vietnam on 11 May 1968.

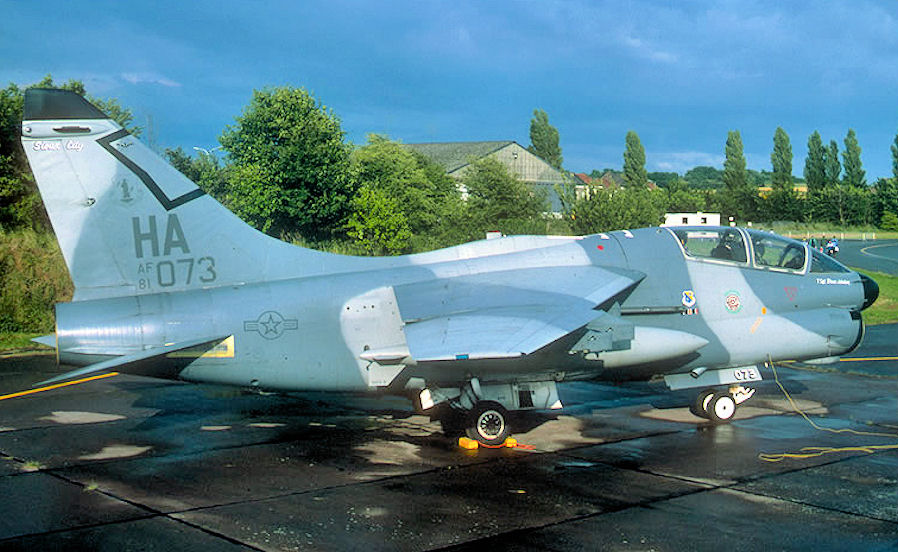
174th Tactical Fighter Squadron A-7K 81-1073

During their year in South Vietnam, the 174th flew 6,539 combat sorties totaling 11,359 hours of combat time. One pilot was killed in action and two airmen were killed on active duty. The unit was awarded the Presidential Unit Citation and the Air Force Outstanding Unit Award. Individually, its members were awarded 12 Silver Stars, 35 Distinguished Flying Crosses, 30 Bronze Stars, 115 Air Force Commendation Medals, 325 Air Medals, and 1 Purple Heart. On 28 May 1969 the personnel and aircraft were returned to Sioux City and released from active duty. In addition, the 174th Fighter Squadron won the Air Force Outstanding Unit Award with a designation of valor.

The "Bat" depicted on the tails of the aircraft and the shoulder patch of the pilots during the Vietnam War became a legendary symbol of the 174th Tactical Fighter Squadron. "Bat" was the call sign of the 174th during its Vietnam War service, and the "Bats" became renowned for their outstanding performance.

The squadron converted to the LTV A-7D Corsair II in 1977. While flying the A-7s, the unit won the Spaatz trophy for the second time in 1990, recognizing them as the best Air Guard unit in the country. The Unit also was awarded the Air Force Outstanding Unit award five times – 1985, 1986, 1987, 1989, and 1991. In 1989, the unit won the 12th Air Force A-7 gunnery meet for the second time.

==== Modern era ====
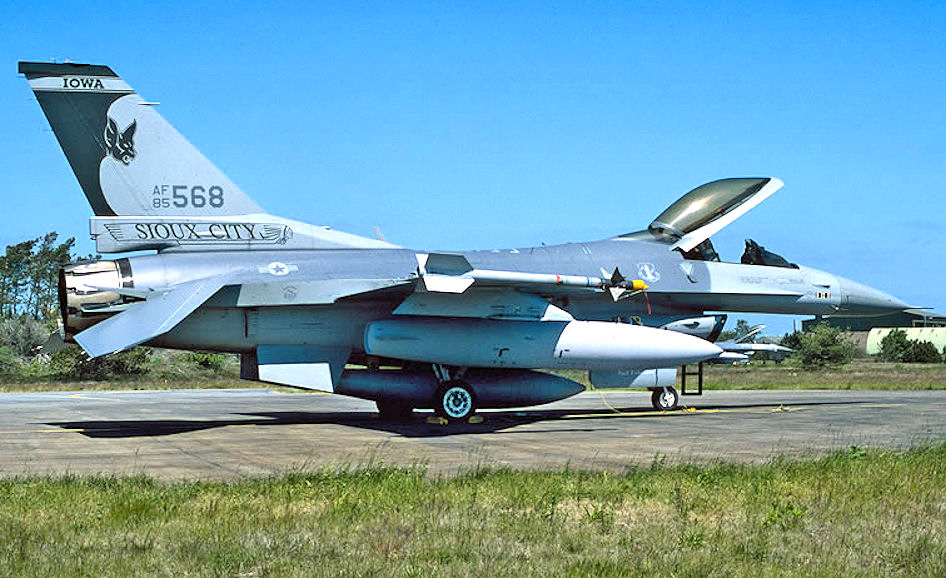
174th Tactical Fighter Squadron F-16C 85-568

On 19 December 1991, the squadron received its first F-16s. The F-16 Fighting Falcon would be the last single-seat fighter jet that the unit would fly before the conversion to KC-135 tankers in 2003.

As part of the global war on terrorism, the squadron has participated in Operation Enduring Freedom, and Operation Iraqi Freedom.

=== Lineage ===
- Constituted as the 386th Fighter Squadron on 27 April 1943

Activated on 15 May 1943
Inactivated on 22 September 1945

- Redesignated 174th Fighter Squadron, Single Engine and allotted to Iowa Air National Guard on 24 May 1946.

Extended Federal recognition on 23 August 1946
Ordered into active service on 1 April 1951
Redesignated 174th Fighter-Bomber Squadron in June 1952
Relieved from active duty and returned to Iowa ANG, on 1 January 1953
Redesignated 174th Fighter Interceptor Squadron on 1 July 1955
Redesignated 174th Tactical Reconnaissance Squadron on 1 July 1958
Redesignated 174th Tactical Fighter Squadron on 1 July 1961
Ordered into active service on 26 January 1968
Relieved from active duty and returned to Iowa ANG, on 28 May 1969
Redesignated 174th Fighter Squadron on 18 March 1992
Redesignated 174th Air Refueling Squadron in 2003

=== Assignments ===
- 365th Fighter Group, 15 May 1943 – 22 September 1945
- 132d Fighter-Interceptor Group (later 132d Fighter-Bomber Group), 23 August 1946 – 1 January 1953
- 132d Fighter-Bomber Group (later 132d Fighter Group), 1 January 1953
- 185th Tactical Fighter Group, 1 October 1962
- 37th Tactical Fighter Wing, 14 May 1968 – 11 May 1969
- 185th Tactical Fighter Group, 12 May 1969
- 185th Operations Group, 18 March 1992 – present

=== Stations ===
- Richmond Army Air Base, Virginia, 15 May 1943
- Langley Field, Virginia, 19 July 1943
- Dover Army Airbase, Delaware, 12 August 1943
- Richmond Army Air Base, Virginia, 19 Nov-4 Dec 1943
- RAF Gosfield (AAF-154), England, 23 December 1943
- RAF Beaulieu (AAF-408), England, 5 March 1944
- Azeville Airfield (A-7), France, 27 June 1944
- Lignerolles Airfield (A-12), France, c. 31 August 1944
- Bretigny Airfield (A-48), France, 3 September 1944
- Juvincourt Airfield (A-68), France, 11 September 1944
- Chièvres Airfield (A-84), Belgium, 4 October 1944
- Metz Airfield (Y-34), France, 29 December 1944
- Florennes/Juzaine Airfield (A-78), Belgium, 30 January 1945
- Aachen Airfield (Y-46), Germany, 17 March 1945
- Fritzlar Airfield (Y-86) (later AAF Station Fritzlar), Germany, 12 April 1945
- Suippes, France, c. 29 July 1945 (Ground echelon)
- Antwerp, Belgium, c. 22 Aug-11 Sep 1945 (Ground echelon, also POE for United States)
- Camp Myles Standish, Massachusetts, 20–22 Sep 1945. (not manned or equipped)
- Sioux Gateway Airport, Iowa, 23 August 1946 – 14 May 1968
- Dow Air Force Base, Maine, 1 April 1951 – 5 November 1952
- Alexandria AFB, Louisiana, 5 November 1952 – 1 January 1953
- Phu Cat Air Base, South Vietnam 14 May 1968 – 11 May 1969
- Sioux Gateway Airport (later Sioux City Air National Guard Base), 11 May 1969 – present

=== Aircraft ===
- Republic P-47 Thunderbolt, 1943–1945
- North American P-51D (later F-51D) Mustang, 1946–1949, 1951–1953
- F-84B Thunderjet, 1949–1951
- Lockheed F-80C Shooting Star, 1953–1955
- Republic F-84E Thunderjet, 1955–1958
- Republic RF-84F Thunderflash, 1958–1961
- North American F-100C Super Sabre, 1961–1977
- LTV A-7D Corsa II, 1977–1991
- Block 30 F-16C/D Fighting Falcon, 1991–2003
- Boeing KC-135R Stratotanker, 2003 – present
