= Ontario Ranch, Ontario, California =

Coordinates: 34.0008°N 117.6103°W

Ontario Ranch
- Master-planned community
- Interactive map of Ontario Ranch
- Country: United States
- State: California
- County: San Bernardino
- City: Ontario
- Website: ontarioranch.com

Ontario Ranch is a master-planned community located in the southern portion of the city of Ontario, California. It is the largest master-planned community in Southern California. The community is located south of E. Riverside Drive, north of Eastvale, and between Euclid and Milliken/Hamner Avenues, 2 miles west of Interstate 15 (the Ontario Freeway) and south of State Route 60 (the Pomona Freeway).

== History ==
The Sphere of Influence area, commonly referred to as the “Ag Preserve,” was the last significant underdeveloped area in the San Bernardino valley. In 1993, the San Bernardino Board of Supervisors voted to consider dissolving the Ag Preserve status, which allowed the transition from agricultural uses to residential and commercial development. On November 30, 1999, the Sphere of Influence was annexed, and became known as “New Model Colony”, a working name used by the City of Ontario to refer to William Chaffey and George Chaffey's efforts in planning Ontario as a model to other cities for layout and infrastructure. The Chaffey brothers purchased the agricultural and ranch lands in 1881.

== Vision ==
Ontario Ranch is envisioned as an 8,069-acre mixed‐use development area. There will be 1,000 acres of public open space, parks and schools that are connected via pathways and trails. The community will be developed over a 20-year period. Once complete, Ontario Ranch will have 47,000 homes and 162,000 residents along with 16 million square feet of retail, office, medical and residential space and eight new schools.

== Planning ==
Currently, 2,900 acres have been approved for single-family residences, multi-family residences, commercial and business park uses. There are an additional 447 acres that have project applications in progress for additional single-family residences and industrial use. According to the City of Ontario, overall density cannot exceed 4.6 units per acre and the average lot size is 6,728 square feet.

== Master-Planned Communities ==
- Park Lane by Lennar
- Park Place by Lewis Community Developers and Stratham Communities
- New Haven by Brookfield Residential
- Grand Park by Lennar
- Landmark by Lennar
- ShadeTree by Landsea Homes
- Neuhouse by Landsea Homes
- Alto by Landsea Homes
- Cascade by Pulte Homes
- Parkside by New Home Co and Lennar

== Neighborhoods ==
- Beacon by Lennar (single-family, detached residences)
- Monument by Lennar (single-family, detached residences)
- West Haven by Lennar (single-family residences)
- Holiday by Brookfield Residential (townhomes)
- Waverly by Brookfield Residential (single-family, detached residences)
- Summerset by Brookfield Residential (single-family detached residences)
- Canopy Creek by Woodside Homes (single-family detached residences)
- Cambridge Court by Woodside Homes
- Waterford by Woodside Homes (single-family detached residences)
- Hadleigh by KB Home (single-family detached residences)
- Margate by KB Home (single-family detached residences)
- Kensington by TRI Point Homes (single-family detached residences)
- St. James by TRI Pointe Homes (single-family detached residences)
- Camden by Ryland Homes (single-family detached residences)
- Meadowood by Taylor Morrison (single-family detached residences)
- Amberly by Landsea Homes (single-family detached residences)
- Birchley by Landsea Homes (single-family detached residences)
- Willowton by Landsea Homes (single-family detached residences)
- Elmwood by Landsea Homes (single-family detached residences)
- Rohe by Landsea Homes (single-family detached residences)
- Alto by Landsea Homes (townhomes)
- Eave by Landsea Homes (townhomes)
- Edenglen by Brookfield Residential (single-family and condominiums)
- Archibald Ranch (single-family detached residences)
- Nuvo Parkside (single-family detached residences)

== The First "Gigabit" Community ==
Ontario Ranch is developing a connected gigabit infrastructure, which will make it the first “gigabit community” in the region, with fiber-optic cable built into the infrastructure to provide ultra-high-speed Internet access to residents. Park Place residents were the first residents to receive access to the gigabit service, costing $60 per month.
