= List of companies based in Miami =

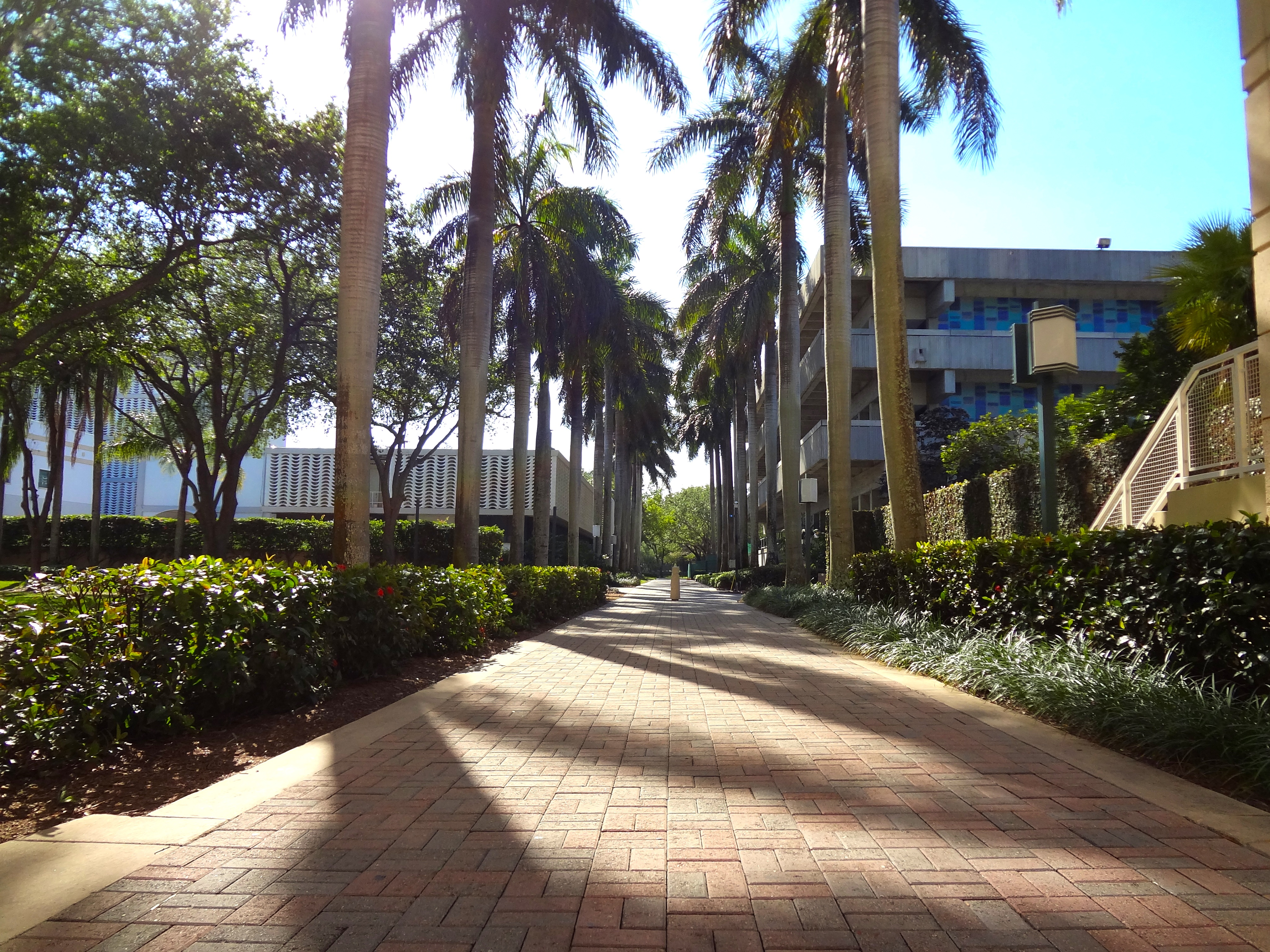
With 21,000 faculty and staff as of 2025, the University of Miami in Coral Gables is Miami-Dade County's second-largest employer, after Baptist Health South Florida.

This is a list of major companies or subsidiaries headquartered in the Miami metropolitan area.

The economy in Miami has largely diversified, with less emphasis on tourism. A number of companies are based in the area, many with connections to Latin America. Because of its proximity to Latin America, Greater Miami serves as the headquarters of Latin American operations for more than 1,100 multinational corporations that add up to more than $221 billion in annual revenue., including AIG, American Airlines, Cisco, Disney, ExxonMobil, Kraft Foods, Microsoft, Oracle, SBC Communications, Sony, Visa and Wal-Mart.

The following five companies are Fortune 500 companies based in the metropolitan area:

(Ranking. Company name (City) Annual revenues) 64. Nextera Energy (Juno Beach, $26.2 billion,
126. Lennar (Miami), $34.2 billion
192. Office Depot (Boca Raton), $12.1 billion
205. World Kinect Corporation (Miami), $11.3 billion
212. AutoNation (Fort Lauderdale), $11 billion
426. Ryder System (Miami), $5 billion

The following are major companies with US/Americas HQ in the metropolitan area that also do business in the US.

- Amadeus IT Group (Doral) - Spain
- Bacardi (Coral Gables) - Bermuda
- Benetton (Miami Beach) - Italy
- Club Med (Coral Gables) - France
- Danone (Coral Gables) - France
- EADS Socata North America (Pembroke Pines) - France
- Embraer (Fort Lauderdale) - Brazil
- Global Crossing Airlines (Miami) - USA
- Iberia Airlines of Spain (Miami) - Spain
- Itau Private Bank International (Miami) - Brazil
- MAPEI (Deerfield Beach) - Italy
- Marine Harvest (Miami) - Norway
- Martinair (Doral) - Netherlands
- Nipro (Miami) - Japan
- Odebrecht (Coral Gables) - Brazil
- OHL USA (Davie) - Spain
- Rinker Materials Corporation (West Palm Beach) - Mexico
- Simclar Group (Hialeah) - UK
- South African Airways (Fort Lauderdale) - South Africa
- Starwood Capital Group (Miami Beach) - USA
- Telefónica (Miami) - Spain
- Teva Pharmaceutical (Miami) - Israel
- Turbana (Coral Gables) - Colombia
- Vinci (Miami) - France
- Wackenhut Corp (Palm Beach Gardens) - USA
- ZLB Plasma Services (Boca Raton) - USA

The following companies are major companies with a regional HQ in the metropolitan area which have a Latin American focus.

- Alcatel-Lucent (Miramar)
- Amazon Prime (Miami)
- Amcor PET Packaging Latin America (Miramar)
- American Airlines (Coral Gables)
- APL (Miami)
- Apple (Coral Gables)
- Canon (Miami)
- Caterpillar (Miami)
- Cisco (Miami)
- DHL Americas (Plantation)
- DHL Global Forwarding (Plantation)
- Eastman Chemical Company (Miami)
- Electrolux (Miami)
- Gap (Miami)
- H.I.G. Capital (Miami)
- Hewlett-Packard (Miami)
- Hilton International (Miami)
- Ingram Micro (Miami)
- Kia (Doral)
- Komatsu (Miami)
- Kraft Foods (Coral Gables)
- Marriott International (Weston)
- Microsoft (Ft. Lauderdale)
- Millicom (Coral Gables)
- Nokia (Miami), moved Latin America Operations
- Novartis (Miami)
- Oracle (Miami)
- Paccar (Miami)
- Porsche (Brickell)
- SAP (Miami)
- Schering-Plough (Miami Lakes)
- Tech Data (Miami)
- Visa (Miami)
- Western Union (Miami)

The following companies are the largest 20 local employers with a HQ in the metropolitan area.

1. American Airlines - 9,000
2. Precision Response Corporation - 5,000
3. Costa Farms - 5,000
4. Royal Caribbean International - 4,000
5. Office Depot - 3,800
6. Carnival Corporation - 3,500
7. Wackenhut- 3,000
8. Motorola - 2,500
9. Assurant - 2,100
10. Burger King - 2,000
11. Pollo Tropical - 2,000
12. Beckman Coulter - 1,800
13. Cordis - 1,800
14. Norwegian Cruise Line - 1,500
15. Interval Leisure Group - 1,130
16. Boston Scientific - 1,000
17. OHL USA - 1,000
18. Securitas Security Services USA - 1,000
19. UPS - 1,000
