= Lincoln Airport (Nebraska) =

Public airport and military airbase serving Lincoln, Nebraska, USA

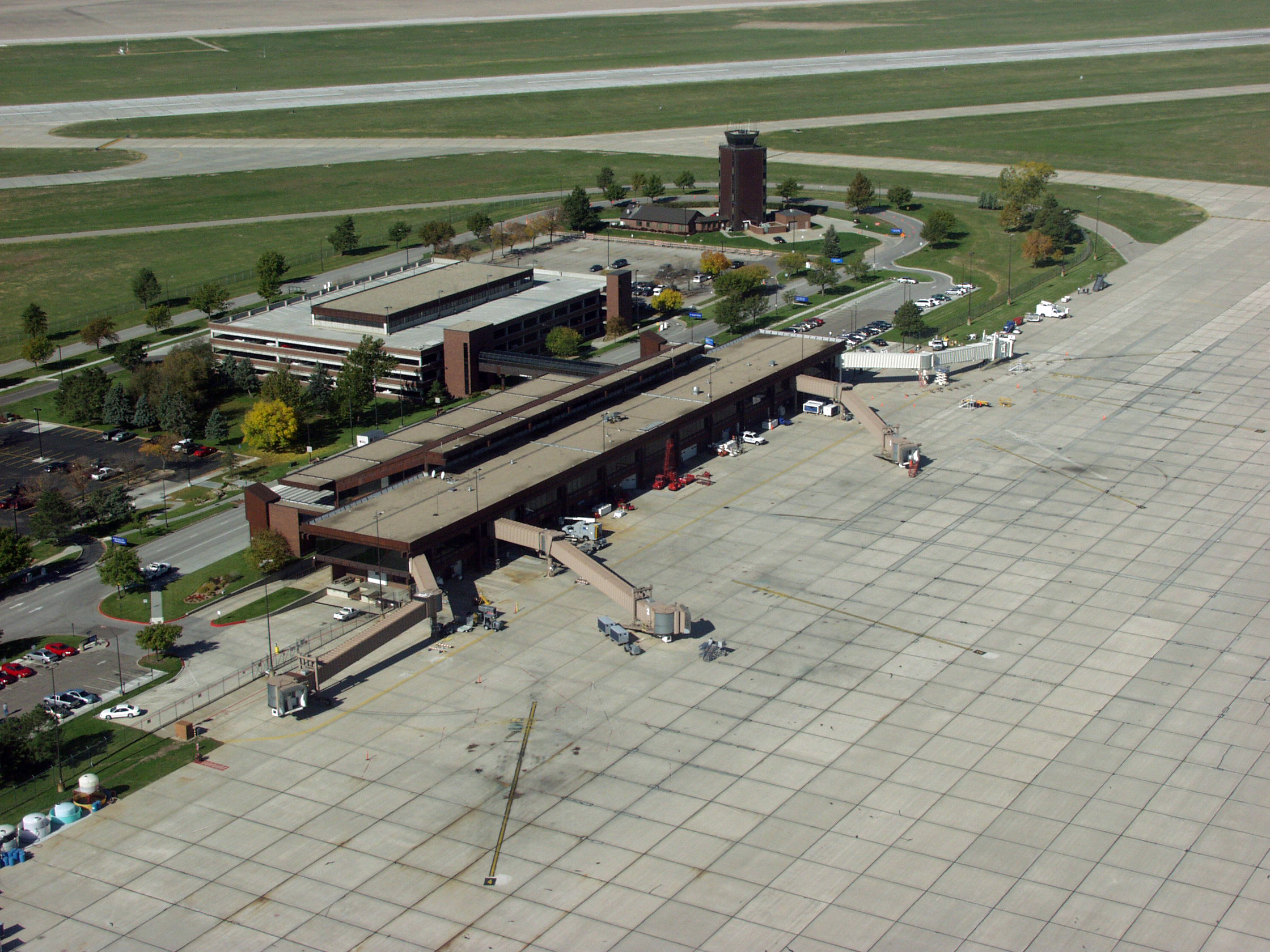
- IATA: LNK; ICAO: KLNK; FAA LID: LNK

Summary
- Airport type: Public / military
- Owner: City of Lincoln
- Operator: Lincoln Airport Authority
- Serves: Southeastern and central Nebraska
- Location: Lincoln, Nebraska
- Elevation AMSL: 1,219 ft (372 m)
- Coordinates: 40°51′04″N 96°45′33″W
- Website: www.lincolnairport.com

Maps
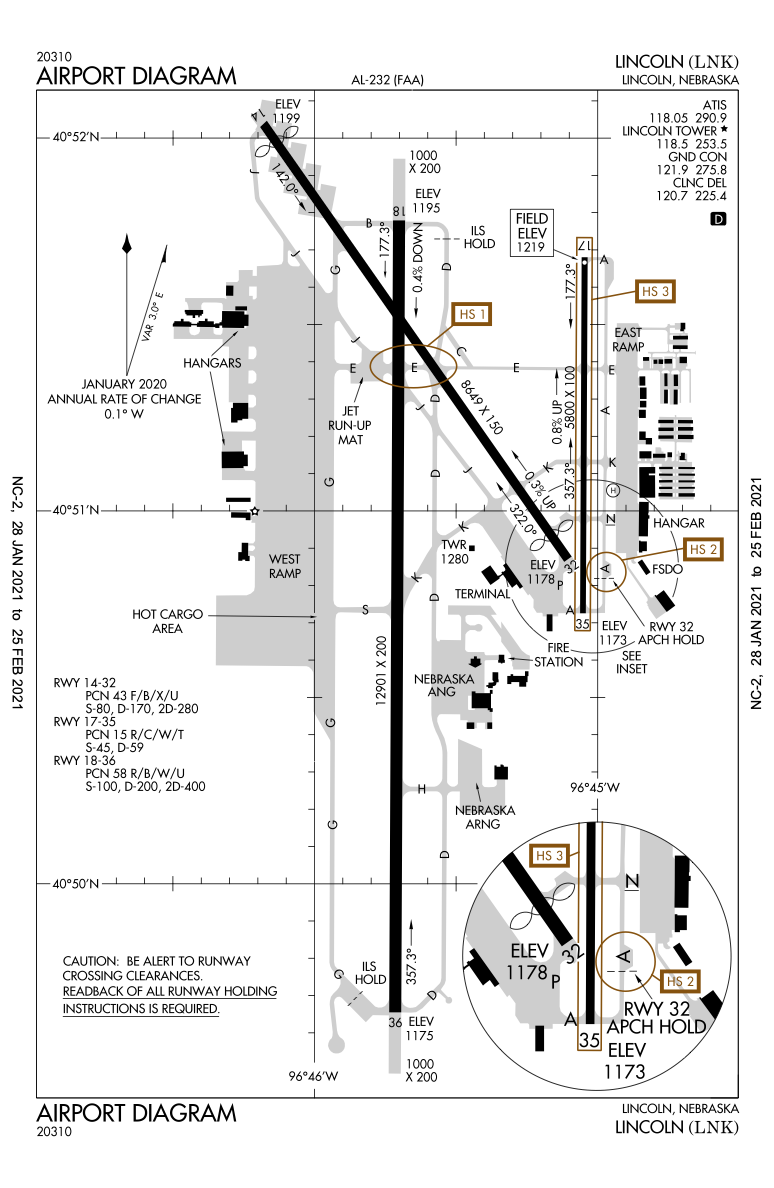
- FAA airport diagram

- Location within Nebraska Location within the United States

Runways
Direction	Length		Surface
Direction	ft	m	Surface
18/36	12,901	3,932	Asphalt/concrete
14/32	8,649	2,636	Asphalt/concrete
17/35	5,800	1,768	Asphalt/concrete

Statistics (2025)
- Total Passengers: 262,000
- Aircraft operations: 79,625
- Based aircraft (2023): 174
- Source: Federal Aviation Administration, BTS

Lincoln Airport (IATA: LNK, ICAO: KLNK, FAA LID: LNK; formerly Lincoln Municipal Airport) is a joint public/military airport five miles (8.0 km) northwest of downtown Lincoln, the state capital, in Lancaster County, Nebraska, United States. It is owned by the Lincoln Airport Authority and is the second-largest airport in Nebraska. It is included in the Federal Aviation Administration (FAA) National Plan of Integrated Airport Systems for 2023–2027 in which it is categorized as a non-hub primary commercial service facility. The passenger terminal has six gates following completion of the LNK Next renovation in 2024.

The 12,901-foot (3,932 m) primary runway was a designated emergency landing site for the Space Shuttle, although it was never used as such. The runway can handle heavy military aircraft including the C-5 Galaxy and the Boeing E-4. The airport is also the home of Lincoln Air National Guard Base, an installation for the KC-135R Stratotanker aircraft operated by the 155th Air Refueling Wing (155 ARW) of the Nebraska Air National Guard. Airliners on charter flights by visiting college athletic teams which play the Nebraska Cornhuskers also utilize Lincoln Airport as a primary destination, although many football teams fly into Omaha's Eppley Airfield, since they lodge in Omaha the night before a game due to lack of available hotel space in Lincoln, then depart from Lincoln immediately after the game. The airport is home to Duncan Aviation, a family-owned aircraft maintenance and refurbishing company. Duncan Aviation has hangars on the east side of the airport and parts storage on the west side.

Lincoln Airport appeared in the 1983 movie Terms of Endearment, the 2008 film Yes Man, and the 2013 animated film Planes.

== History ==
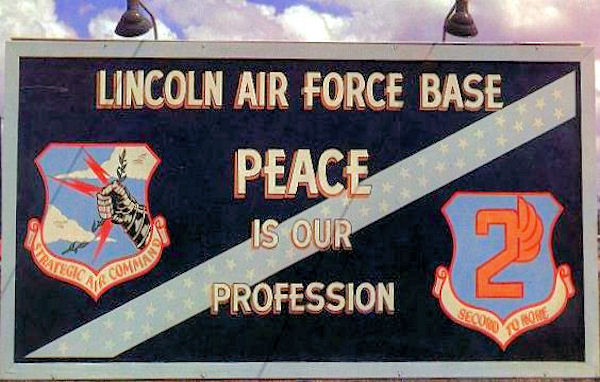
Lincoln Air Force Base sign (apx. 1960)

What became Lincoln Airport began in the early 1920s, when the city selected land northwest of Lincoln for a municipal airfield. Charles Lindbergh received flying instruction in Lincoln in 1922. The airfield became a stop for the predecessor of United Airlines in 1927 and an air-mail stop the following year. United continues to serve Lincoln through United Express. The Lincoln Airplane and Flying School was established in 1928 and operated at the airfield (which briefly was known as Lindbergh Field), before later moving to Union Airport a few miles east.

=== World War II and first military use ===
In 1939, the Lincoln Airplane and Flying School was one of nine civilian contract flight schools contracted by the United States Army Air Corps as Lincoln Army Air Field for basic flight training of air cadets under the 4,500-pilot training expansion program. The school was operated by E.J. Sias. However, due to the short summer flying season, flight training in Lincoln was closed on 15 November 1940 and moved to Drane Field in Lakeland, Florida where it reopened with new owners under the name "Lakeland School of Aeronautics" and continued Army contract pilot training. As part of the contract flying school, the Air Corps established the 47th Training Detachment to command the military flight cadets at the school, which apparently also moved to Lakeland along with the school. The school/base closed in December 1945 and the airport was transferred back to the City of Lincoln.

Along with its civil use, Lincoln Airport became host to a flying unit of the newly formed Nebraska Air National Guard along with a Naval Reserve unit flying patrol aircraft. The 173rd Fighter Squadron became the host unit of what became known as Lincoln Air National Guard Base. Equipped with P-51 Mustang fighters in 1946, it was the second Air National Guard unit established. A few years later, F-80C Shooting Star jet fighters replaced the Mustangs until the advent of the Korean War. The U.S. Navy Reserve also established Naval Air Station Lincoln (NAS Lincoln) on the airport, primarily as home to Patrol Squadron 762 (VP-762) and its P-2 Neptune aircraft.

=== Lincoln Air Force Base ===
In 1952, the U.S. Air Force took over the airport as Lincoln Air Force Base, complicating civilian general and commercial aviation in the city. The airport's 12,901-foot (3,932 m) x 200-foot (61 m) primary runway was originally built to support operations of the Boeing B-47 Stratojet long-range, six-engined, turbojet-powered strategic bomber. The long runway was needed as early jet engines produced poor thrust at low speeds, requiring a significant takeoff roll to reach rotation especially when fully fueled and loaded with ordnance; the B-47 was often equipped with rocket-assisted takeoff equipment. In 1959, the diagonal runway (14/32) was closed.

In late 1963, a new 4,000-foot (1,220 m) runway (17/35) parallel to the main runway, with associated facilities for general and commercial aviation, was opened on the east side of the airport to reduce the number of non-military aircraft movements on the main runway.

=== The U.S. Air Force leaves the airport ===
After operating as a Strategic Air Command (SAC) base supporting B-47s, KC-97 refueling aircraft (by 1954), and Atlas intercontinental ballistic missiles (by 1962), the Air Force closed the installation in 1966 and returned it to civilian hands. During the 1960s, the two main airlines at Lincoln were United Airlines and the original Frontier Airlines. Frontier Convair 580s flew nonstop and direct to Denver and Kansas City. United Douglas DC-6Bs flew nonstop to Denver, but nonstops to Chicago didn't start until 1967. Lincoln's first jet service began in 1966, with Frontier Boeing 727-100s operating between Denver and Kansas City via Lincoln. In 1956, runway 14/32 was reopened. United Boeing 727-100s and Boeing 737-200s began flying nonstop to Chicago and Denver about 1968; LNK later saw United 727-200s, 737-300s, 737-500s, and Airbus A320s. Frontier later operated 737-200s.

Other jet service was operated by America West with Boeing 737-200s and 737-300s nonstop to Phoenix and Trans World Airlines (TWA) DC-9s nonstop to St. Louis. In 1983, Midway Airlines was operating Douglas DC-9-10 jets direct to Chicago Midway Airport via a stop in Omaha. By 1985, three airlines were operating jet service into the airport according to the Official Airline Guide (OAG) including Air Wisconsin with British Aircraft Corporation BAC One-Elevens nonstop from Chicago O'Hare Airport and Grand Island, NE, Frontier with Boeing 737-200s and McDonnell Douglas MD-80s nonstop from Denver and Omaha, and United with Boeing 727-100s and Boeing 737-200s nonstop from Chicago O'Hare, Denver, Cedar Rapids, and Peoria. The original Frontier Airlines ceased operations in 1986; successor Continental Airlines flew 737s and DC-9s to Denver. United mainline jet service was eventually replaced by flights operated by its United Express partners, who now fly 50-seat regional jets from LNK.

In 2005, Northwest Airlines flew to Memphis but dropped the route within nine months. In early 2006, Allegiant Air began air service to Las Vegas but after two years, announced that it was transferring service to Grand Island, NE. In May 2014 Delta Air Lines announced a non-stop flight to Atlanta would start September 8, resuming a service it briefly ran in 2009. In 2011 Delta resumed the Memphis service, but only over the summer. $750,000 in federal spending was used to guarantee revenue for Delta.

In 2022, Lincoln Airport announced a new airline called "Red Way," which is a virtual airline that outsources planes from GlobalX. But in September, Red Way shut down due to a lack of resources. Because the airline didn't save money of people's ticket expenditures in a bank account until the actual flights happened, the company was unable to pay refunds until 2024. State auditor Mike Foley has criticized the airline, calling it a "failed riverboat gamble."

The Lincoln Airport terminal underwent a major renovation and expansion project, branded "LNK Next", beginning in 2022 and completed in 2024. The project added two gates, bringing the terminal total to six, installed two baggage-claim belts, and relocated customer-service and rental-car facilities. In January 2026, a three-phase reconstruction of Lincoln Airport's main runway began, expected to take until fall 2027. The old pavement, some of it dating from the 1950s, is to be completely removed and replaced with modern pavement meeting current FAA standards.

== Facilities ==
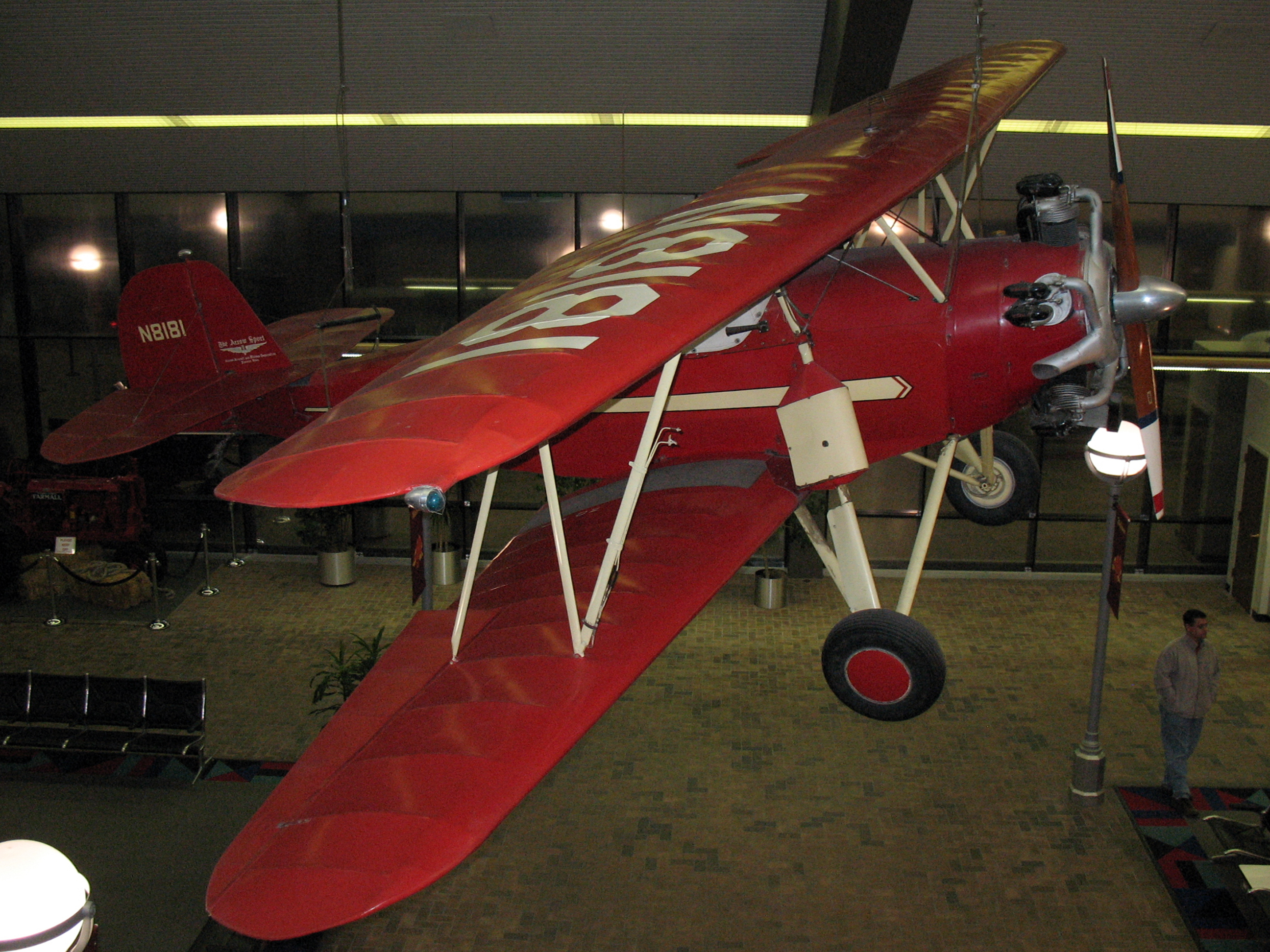
An Arrow Sport, owned by the Nebraska State Historical Society, preserved at the Lincoln Airport terminal building. The aircraft's manufacturer, Arrow, was based in Lincoln.

Lincoln Airport covers 5,000 acres (7.8 sq mi; 20 km^{2}) at an elevation of 1,219 feet (372 m). It has three asphalt/concrete runways: 18/36 is 12,901 by 200 feet (3,932 x 61 m); 14/32 is 8,649 by 150 feet (2,636 x 46 m); and 17/35 is 5,800 by 100 feet (1,768 x 30 m).

In the year ending March 31, 2021, the airport had 58,577 aircraft operations, averaging 160 per day: approximately 62% general aviation, 21% military, 13% air taxi, and 5% airline. In March 2023, 174 aircraft were then based at this airport: 115 single-engine, 14 multi-engine, 22 military, 21 jet, and 2 helicopter.

== Air and Army National Guard ==
The military portion of the airport is home to the Nebraska Air National Guard's 155th Air Refueling Wing (155 ARW), an Air Mobility Command-gained unit equipped with the KC-135R Stratotanker. The wing traces its lineage to the 401st Fighter Squadron, which was redesignated as the 173rd Fighter Squadron and activated in Lincoln on July 26, 1946. The Nebraska Air National Guard describes the organization as the second-oldest Air National Guard unit in the United States. The unit initially operated P-51 Mustang fighters and received F-80 Shooting Star jets in 1948. When Lincoln Air Force Base was reactivated as a Strategic Air Command installation in 1955, the Air National Guard moved to newly constructed facilities south of the commercial terminal. The unit became part of the 155th Fighter Group in 1960, converted to tactical reconnaissance in 1964, and began transitioning to the KC-135 in 1992. It was redesignated the 155th Air Refueling Wing in 1995. Military and civilian aircraft use the airport's shared runway system, while military aircraft taxi to secured National Guard facilities guarded by Air Force Security Forces rather than the passenger terminal.

Several Nebraska Army National Guard units are also tenants at the installation, and the military portion of the base is home to the Nebraska National Guard's Joint Force Headquarters (JFHQ), containing the state adjutant general's office.

The base has temporarily hosted aircraft and personnel from the U.S. Air Force's 55th Wing when operations at Offutt Air Force Base were disrupted. Nine aircraft were evacuated from Offutt during the 2019 Midwestern U.S. floods, and E-4B aircraft operated from Lincoln during Offutt's subsequent runway replacement.

== Airlines and destinations ==
Airlines	Destinations
American Eagle	Chicago–O'Hare (ends April 5, 2027), Dallas/Fort Worth; Seasonal: Phoenix–Sky Harbor (begins December 17, 2026)
Breeze Airways	Las Vegas, Orlando
United Express	Chicago–O'Hare, Denver

Destinations map
Destinations from Lincoln Airport
Red = Year-round destination
Blue = Future destination
Green = Seasonal destination
Pink = Destination being terminated

== Ground transportation ==
As of 2022, the local transit provider StarTran provides bus service to Lincoln Airport. The bus stop is located at the north end of the terminal loading/unloading area. Route 52 provides service to downtown, where transfers can be made, as well as providing direct service to the Highlands neighborhood northeast of the airport.

== Statistics ==
=== Top destinations ===
Busiest domestic routes from LNK (June 2025 - May 2026)
Rank	Airport	Passengers	Carriers
1	Denver, Colorado	68,120	United
2	Chicago–O'Hare, Illinois	64,900	United
3	Orlando, Florida	4,950	Breeze
4	Las Vegas, Nevada	1,420	Breeze

=== Carrier shares ===
Carrier shares (June 2025 - May 2026)
Carrier	Passengers (arriving and departing)
SkyWest	261,000(95.41%)
Breeze	12,130(4.36%)
GoJet	480(0.17%)
CommuteAir	160(0.06%)

== Accidents and incidents ==
On September 25, 1973, a Learjet 25 operated by Lisa Jet crashed after takeoff bound for Eppley Field in low ceiling/fog conditions. All three occupants (two crew, one passenger) were killed. Inadequate preflight planning and poor crew coordination were the probable cause.

== See also ==
- Nebraska World War II Army Airfields
- Nebraska Air National Guard
- List of airports in Nebraska
- Airport (1970 film): the movie is set at a fictitious "Lincoln International Airport"
