= Red Way =

Virtual airline in Lincoln, Nebraska

- Founded: March 2023; 3 years ago
- Commenced operations: June 8, 2023; 2 years ago
- Ceased operations: August 31, 2023; 2 years ago
- Hubs: Lincoln Airport
- Headquarters: Lincoln, Nebraska, U.S.
- Key people: Nickolas Wangler
- Website: goflyred.com

Red Way was an American virtual airline headquartered in Lincoln, Nebraska, with its hub at Lincoln Airport. The airline's first flight occurred on June 8, 2023, with its flights operated by Global Crossing Airlines through a public charter agreement. Red Way ceased operations on August 31, 2023.

== History ==
=== Establishment ===
In March 2023, Red Way was announced as a new airline serving seven domestic destinations from Lincoln, Nebraska, consisting of Atlanta, Austin, Dallas, Las Vegas, Minneapolis, Nashville, and Orlando, with plans to begin operations from Lincoln Airport in June 2023. The airline commenced operations on June 8, 2023, operating as a virtual airline by selling seats on aircraft owned and operated by Global Crossing Airlines under the banner of GlobalX Air Tours, as Red Way lacked its own air operator's certificate. The establishment of the airline was enabled by a $3 million fund from the American Rescue Plan Act provided via the City of Lincoln, which significantly reduced start-up costs.

=== Operation ===
Red Way originally planned to fly mostly seasonal routes but changed its schedule to twice-weekly flights to each destination, with increased service on some routes from September 2023, before extending its schedule through November 2023, citing strong demand. Despite this, the airline announced on August 23, 2023, that it would cease operations at the end of that month, with the last flight occurring on August 31, 2023. The airline cited costs and lack of resources as the reason for ceasing operations. The airline operated for less than 3 months.

Red Way is now under investigation by the Nebraska State Auditor's Office due to use of ARPA funds from the City of Lincoln and Lancaster County, Nebraska.

== Destinations ==
Red Way flew from Lincoln Airport to several destinations within the United States:

State	City	Airport	Start date	End date	Notes	Ref
Florida	Orlando	Orlando International Airport	June 8, 2023	August 31, 2023		
Georgia	Atlanta	Hartsfield–Jackson Atlanta International Airport	June 16, 2023	August 6, 2023		
Minnesota	Minneapolis/Saint Paul	Minneapolis–Saint Paul International Airport	June 16, 2023	August 8, 2023		
Nebraska	Lincoln	Lincoln Airport	June 8, 2023	August 31, 2023	Hub	
Nevada	Las Vegas	Harry Reid International Airport	June 8, 2023	August 31, 2023		
Tennessee	Nashville	Nashville International Airport	June 24, 2023	August 30, 2023		
Texas	Austin	Austin–Bergstrom International Airport	June 24, 2023	August 5, 2023		
Texas	Dallas/Fort Worth	Dallas Fort Worth International Airport	June 16, 2023	August 28, 2023		

== Fleet ==
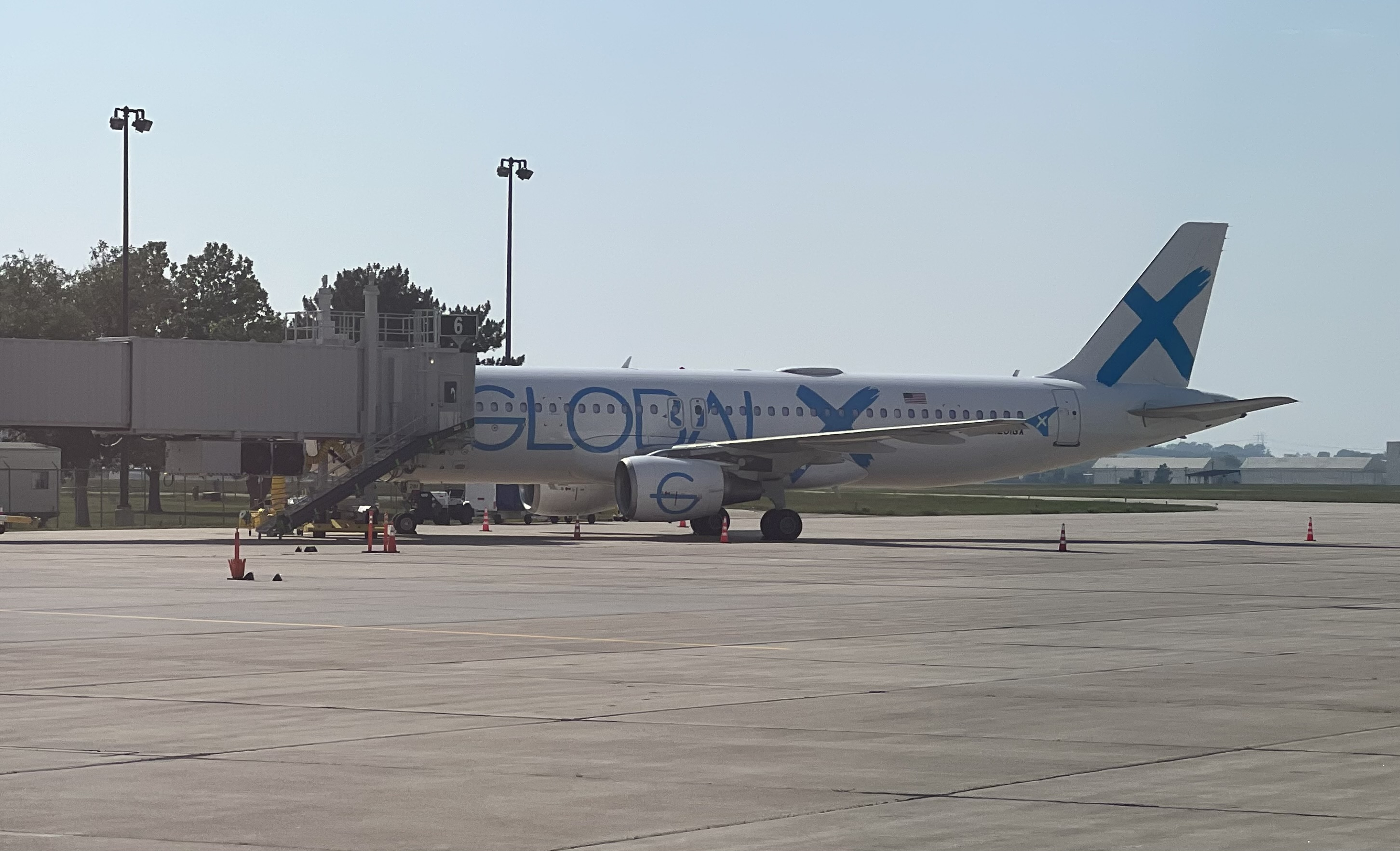
A GlobalX Airbus A320-200 chartered by Red Way at Lincoln Airport in June 2023

Red Way did not own its aircraft, instead, it chartered its flights through Global Crossing Airlines, which operates a mix of Airbus A320 and Airbus A321 aircraft.

== Service concept ==
Red Way operated a business model used by other low-cost carriers, with lower fares while additional services such as baggage allowances or in-flight catering were offered at an additional cost.

== See also ==
- List of airlines of the United States
