= CalAtlantic Homes =

American home construction company

CalAtlantic Group, Inc.
- Industry: Home construction
- Predecessors: Standard Pacific Homes and Ryland Homes
- Founded: October 1, 2015; 11 years ago
- Defunct: February 12, 2018; 8 years ago
- Fate: Acquired by Lennar
- Headquarters: Arlington, Virginia
- Key people: Scott D. Stowell, Chairman; Larry T. Nicholson, CEO & President; Jeff J. McCall, CFO
- Production output: 14,229 deliveries
- Revenue: ▲$6.476 billion (2016)
- Net income: ▲$0.484 billion (2016)
- Total assets: ▲$8.709 billion (2016)
- Total equity: ▲$4.207 billion (2016)
- Number of employees: 3,055 (2016)

CalAtlantic Group, Inc. was a home construction company based in Arlington, Virginia. It was formed by the October 2015 merger of Standard Pacific Homes and Ryland Homes. In February 2018, the company was acquired by Lennar.

== History ==
Standard Pacific was incorporated in 1961 by Arthur Svendsen and Ronald Foell, and began construction of its first subdivision in 1965. Operations expanded to include San Diego in 1969, Texas in 1978, Arizona in 1998, Colorado in 2000, and Florida in 2002.

On October 1, 2015, Standard Pacific Homes and Ryland Homes merged to form CalAtlantic.

== Recognition ==
In 2016, Builder Magazine named CalAtlantic its builder of the year.

In 2018, it was the 4th largest homebuilder in the United States by number of homes closed.

== Acquisitions ==
In June 2017, the company acquired Oakpointe, LLC and entered the Seattle market.

In February 2018, the company was acquired by Lennar.

== See also ==
- Beazer Homes USA
