= 155th Air Refueling Wing =

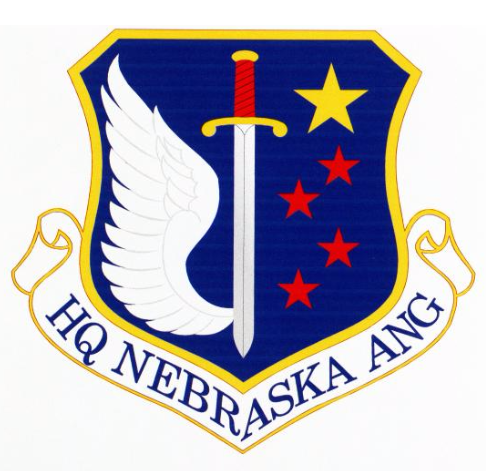
155th Air Refueling Wing

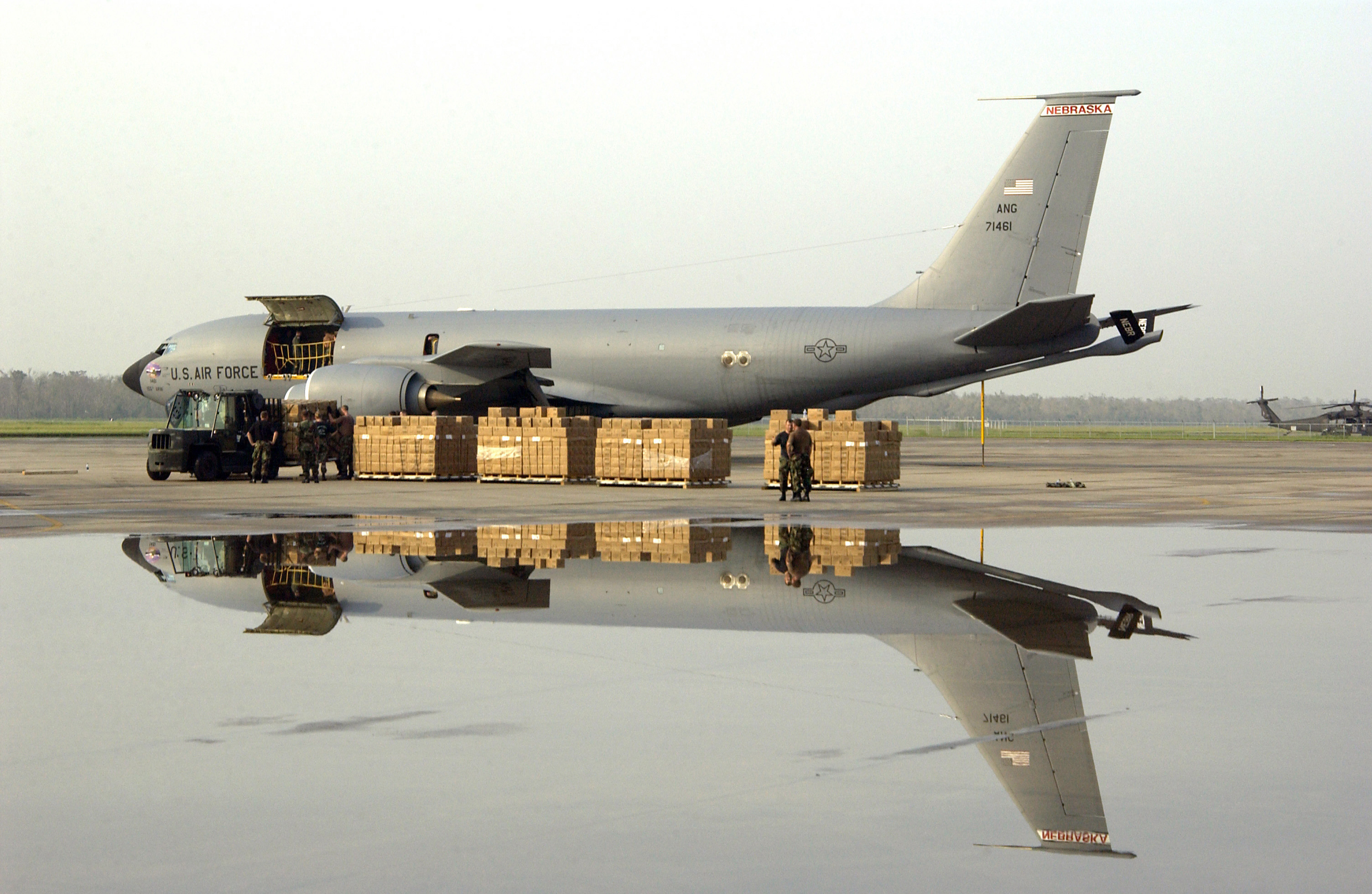
- A wing KC-135R Stratotanker unloading cargo in 2005
- Active: 1960-present
- Country: United States
- Allegiance: Nebraska
- Branch: Air National Guard
- Type: Wing
- Role: Aerial refueling
- Part of: Nebraska Air National Guard
- Garrison/HQ: Lincoln Air National Guard Base, Nebraska
- Nickname: "Hustlin "Huskers"

Commanders
- Current commander: Colonel Christopher L. Hesse

Insignia
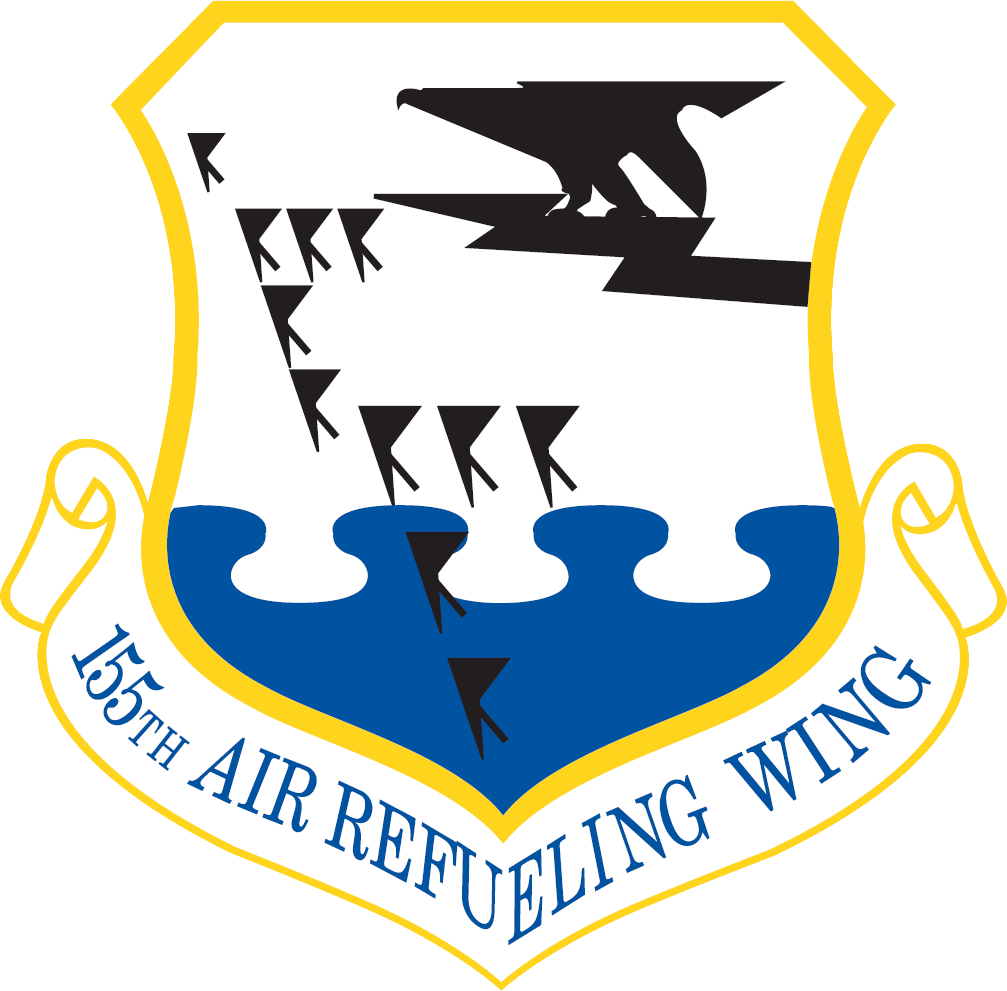
- 155th Air Refueling Wing emblem
- Tail stripe: White stripe with "Nebraska" in red lettering

The 155th Air Refueling Wing is a unit of the Nebraska Air National Guard, stationed at Lincoln Air National Guard Base, Nebraska. If activated to federal service, the Wing is gained by the United States Air Force Air Mobility Command.

== Mission ==
The 155th operates the KC-135R Stratotanker, which is responsible for conducting air refueling missions around the world. The unit runs like an active duty base on a smaller scale.

Full-time Air Force Security Forces personnel patrol the base and provide security for the aircraft 24 hours a day while firefighter personnel are always on station and on call. The other units on the base usually operate during the day and are also staffed by Active Guard Reserve (AGR) or civilian Technician personnel.

== History ==
Established on 1 June 1960 as the 155th Fighter Group by the Nebraska Air National Guard as an expansion of the 173d Fighter-Interceptor Squadron. The 173rd FIS had won the coveted Spaatz Trophy as the Guard's finest flying unit in 1963, following second and third-place finishes in 1961 and 1962 respectively. In 1962, 1963, and 1964 the unit won its second, third and fourth Winston P. Wilson Trophies.

In May 1964, the mission of the Nebraska Air Guard was changed from air defense to tactical reconnaissance using the Republic RF-84 Thunderflash aircraft; the 173rd became the 173rd Tactical Reconnaissance Squadron and the 155th Fighter Group became the 155th Tactical Reconnaissance Group. The first McDonnell RF-4C Phantom II came to Lincoln in November 1971. In 1972 the unit began its conversion to the RF-4C from the RF-84F.

In April 1992 the unit was directed to convert to the KC-135R Stratotanker when the U.S. Air Force decided to begin retiring the last of the F-4 Phantom II aircraft. The conversion to the aerial refueling mission began in September 1993 with the arrival of the first KC-135R tanker. On 1 October 1995, the unit was re-designated as the 155th Air Refueling Wing after achieving initial operational capability in the refueling mission three months early.

In April 1999, the unit flew its first combat missions. It was the first Air Guard tanker unit to be tasked with supporting Operation Allied Force, the NATO bombing campaign of Serbia and Kosovo. The unit successfully deployed two aircraft and more than 80 personnel to Germany in less than three days and soon became the lead unit for all American tanker operations from its German air base.

=== Assistance ===
Along with its federal mission, the Nebraska unit is tasked with supporting the state government as well. Since its organization in 1946, it has answered the governor's call on numerous occasions including Operation Snowbound in early 1949 and a special call in May 1975 when 435 Air Guard members were activated to assist in securing a tornado ravaged area in Omaha. In November 1997, Air Guard members were once again called to state active duty to assist in helping Lincoln and neighboring communities recover from an early snowstorm that cut power to nearly one million Nebraskans as a part of Operation Bush Hog.

== Lineage ==
- Established as the 155th Fighter Group (Air Defense) and allotted to the Air National Guard on 24 June 1960 Extended federal recognition and activated on 1 July 1960

Redesignated 155th Tactical Reconnaissance Group on 1 May 1964
Redesignated 155th Reconnaissance Group on 16 March 1992
Redesignated 155th Air Refueling Group on 1 January 1994
Redesignated 155th Air Refueling Wing on 1 October 1995

=== Assignments ===
- Nebraska Air National Guard, 1 June 1960 – present

Gained by: Air Defense Command
Gained by: Tactical Air Command, 1 May 1964
Gained by: Air Combat Command, 1 June 1992
Gained by: Air Mobility Command, 1 January 1994 – present

=== Components ===
- 155th Operations Group, c. 1 March 1994 – present
- 173d Fighter-Interceptor Squadron (later 173d Tactical Reconnaissance Squadron, 273d Reconnaissance Squadron, 173d Air Refueling Squadron), 1 June 1960 – c. 1 March 1994

=== Stations ===
- Lincoln Air Force Base (later Nebraska Air National Guard Base), 1 June 1960 – present

=== Aircraft ===
- F-86L Sabre Interceptor, 1960-1964
- RF-84F Thunderstreak, 1964-1972
- RF-4C Phantom II, 1972-1993
- KC-135R Stratotanker, 1993–present
