= Veev (construction company) =

American prefabricated building company

- Type: Private
- Industry: Construction Technology
- Founded: 2008; 18 years ago
- Headquarters: Hayward, California, U.S.
- Area served: United States
- Products: Panelized wall systems; Modular housing platforms
- Services: Offsite construction; Prefabricated housing systems
- Website: veev.com

Veev is a panelized construction company that focuses on prefabricated building systems. The company has developed a proprietary construction platform combining digital manufacturing with sustainable materials, with the goal of improving efficiency and reducing environmental impact in home construction.

== History ==
Veev was founded in 2008 to explore a panelized approach to homebuilding. Its system involves off-site wall manufacturing with mechanical, electrical, plumbing (MEP), and fire safety systems integrated to reduce labor, construction time, and material waste.

In 2020, Veev raised $75 million from LenX, the venture arm of Lennar. The company was valued at over $1 billion following a $400 million Series D round in 2022.

In 2023, Lennar acquired Veev's assets and began using its platform within its own operations.

== Technology ==
Veev's construction system includes cold-formed steel framing and acrylic finishes fabricated through digital design and Computer Numerical Control (CNC) processes.

The company holds patents for prefabricated wall assemblies with embedded MEP systems. One patent describes a multi-head fire sprinkler system designed to serve multiple rooms via a single conduit.

A 2023 Forbes article noted that Veev's approach reportedly reduced embodied carbon by 50% and construction waste by 89% compared to traditional homebuilding methods.

== Recognition ==
In 2025, Veev received the StopWaste Environmental Leadership Award for its home construction approach that reduces waste, emissions, and on-site disruption.

That same year, the company was recognized in the Gold Nugget Awards as an Award of Merit Winner in the category Innovative Housing Concepts – Construction Technology.
