= Nebraska Air National Guard =

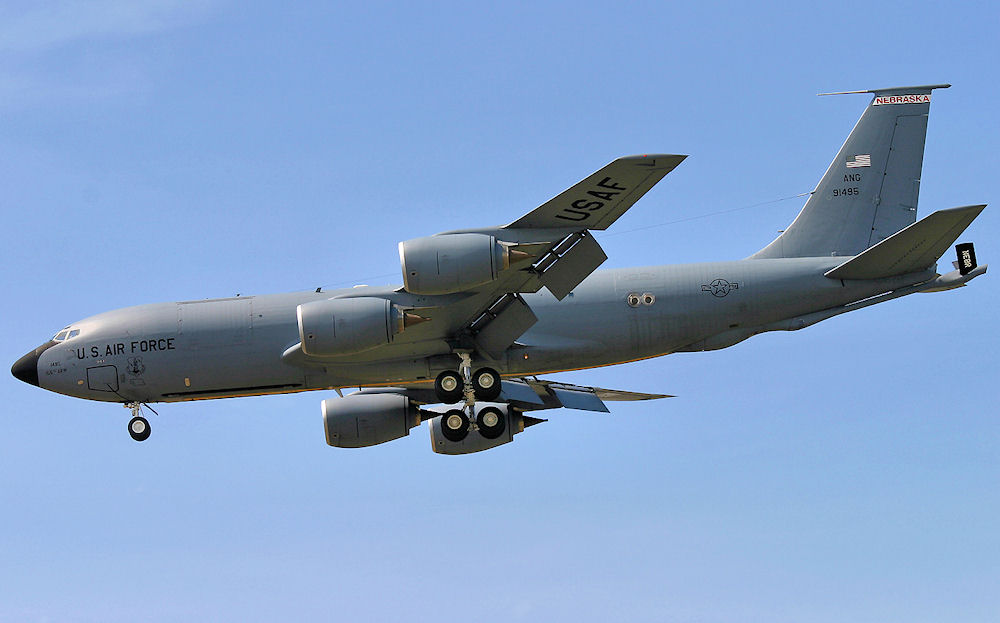
- A Boeing KC-135 Stratotanker of the 173d Air Refueling Squadron, landing at Lincoln ANGB. The 173d ARS is the oldest unit in the Nebraska Air National Guard, having over 60 years of service to the state and nation.
- Active: 26 July 1946 – present
- Country: United States
- Allegiance: Nebraska
- Branch: Air National Guard
- Type: State militia, military reserve force
- Role: "To meet state and federal mission responsibilities."
- Size: 1,002
- Part of: Nebraska National Guard; Nebraska Military Department; United States National Guard Bureau
- Garrison/HQ: Nebraska Military Department, 1300 Military Road, Lincoln, Nebraska, 68508

Commanders
- Civilian leadership: President Donald Trump (Commander-in-Chief); Troy Meink (Secretary of the Air Force); Governor Jim Pillen (Governor of the State of Nebraska)
- State military leadership: Major General Craig W. Strong

Insignia
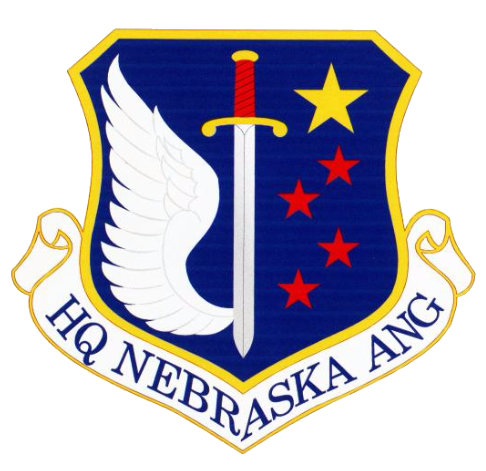
- Nebraska Air National Guard emblem

Aircraft flown
- Reconnaissance: RC-135
- Tanker: KC-135R Stratotanker

The Nebraska Air National Guard (NE ANG) is the aerial militia of the State of Nebraska, United States of America. It is a reserve of the United States Air Force and along with the Nebraska Army National Guard, an element of the Nebraska National Guard of the larger United States National Guard Bureau.

As state militia units, the units in the Nebraska Air National Guard are not in the normal United States Air Force chain of command. They are under the jurisdiction of the governor of Nebraska though the office of the Nebraska Adjutant General unless they are federalized by order of the president of the United States. The Nebraska Air National Guard is headquartered at Lincoln Air National Guard Base, and its commander is currently Brigadier General Wendy Johnson.

== Overview ==
Under the "Total Force" concept, Nebraska Air National Guard units are considered to be Air Reserve Components (ARC) of the United States Air Force (USAF). Nebraska ANG units are trained and equipped by the Air Force and are operationally gained by a major command of the USAF if federalized. In addition, the Nebraska Air National Guard forces are assigned to Air Expeditionary Forces and are subject to deployment tasking orders along with their active duty and Air Force Reserve counterparts in their assigned cycle deployment window.

Along with their federal reserve obligations, as state militia units the elements of the Nebraska ANG are subject to being activated by order of the governor to provide protection of life and property, and preserve peace, order and public safety. State missions include disaster relief in times of earthquakes, hurricanes, floods and forest fires, search and rescue, protection of vital public services, and support to civil defense.

== Components ==
The Nebraska Air National Guard consists of the following major units:

- 155th Air Refueling Wing

Established 26 July 1946 (as: 173d Fighter Squadron); operates: KC-135R Stratotanker
Stationed at: Lincoln Air National Guard Base, Lincoln
Gained by: Air Mobility Command
The 155th operates the KC-135R Stratotanker, which is responsible for conducting air refueling missions around the world.

- 170th Group

Established 7 July 2007
Stationed at: Offutt Air Force Base, Omaha
Gained by: Air Combat Command
The 170th Group administratively organizes Nebraska ANG members assigned to Offutt under the Offutt AFB Future Total Force Initiative.

== History ==
On 24 May 1946, the United States Army Air Forces, in response to dramatic postwar military budget cuts imposed by President Harry S. Truman, allocated inactive unit designations to the National Guard Bureau for the formation of an Air Force National Guard. These unit designations were allotted and transferred to various State National Guard bureaus to provide them unit designations to re-establish them as Air National Guard units.

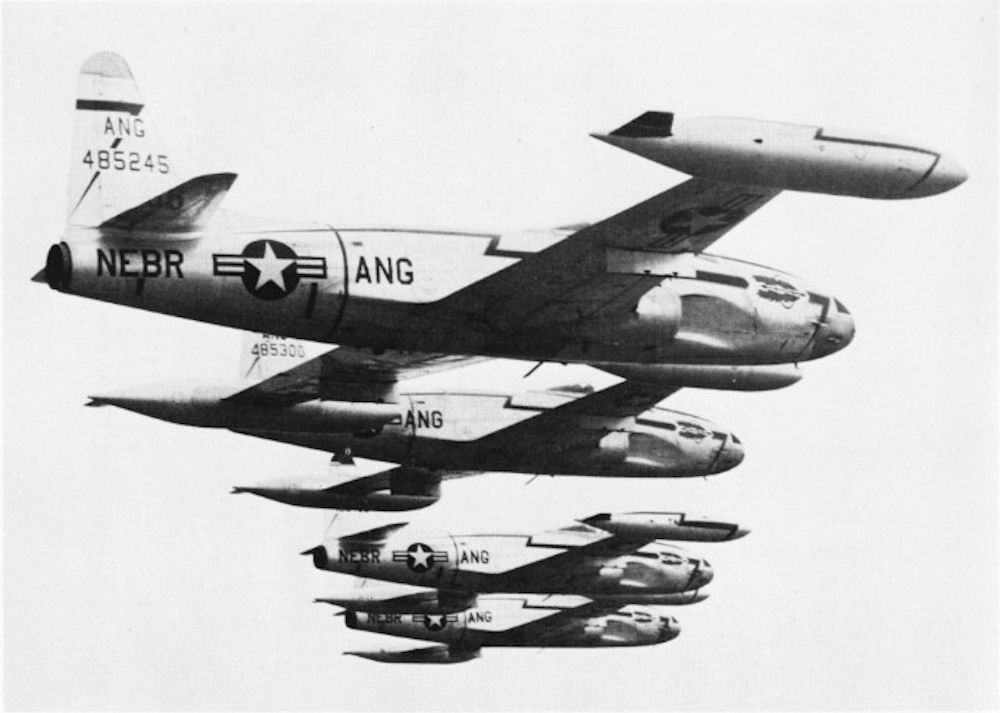
F-80A Shooting Stars of the 173d Fighter Squadron in formation, 1948

The Nebraska Air National Guard origins date to the formation of the 173d Fighter Squadron at Lincoln Army Airfield, Lincoln, receiving federal recognition on 26 July 1946. It was equipped with F-51D Mustangs and its mission was the air defense of the state. 18 September 1947, the Nebraska Air National Guard separated from the Army Air Corps upon the establishment of the United States Air Force as a separate branch of the United States military under the National Security Act.

On 1 July 1960 the 173d Fighter-Interceptor Squadron was authorized to expand to a group level, and the 155th Fighter-Interceptor Group was allotted by the National Guard Bureau, extended federal recognition and activated.

Today, the 155th Air Refueling Wing (155 ARW) provides aerial refueling support to Air Force, Navy and Marine Corps and allied nation aircraft. In 2007, the 170th Group at Offutt AFB was formed. The 170th evolved from Detachment 1, Headquarters Nebraska ANG established in June 2002. Under this initiative, highly qualified ANG instructor aircrew integrate into the 338th Combat Training Squadron to provide initial qualification, re-qualification and upgrade training to active duty and ANG aircrew members. These functional areas include requirements, weapons and tactics, intelligence, base operations, weather, and aviation resource management.

After the September 11th, 2001 terrorist attacks on the United States, elements of every Air National Guard unit in Washington has been activated in support of the global war on terrorism. Flight crews, aircraft maintenance personnel, communications technicians, air controllers and air security personnel were engaged in Operation Noble Eagle air defense overflights of major United States cities. Also, Nebraska ANG units have been deployed overseas as part of Operation Enduring Freedom in Afghanistan and Operation Iraqi Freedom in Iraq as well as other locations as directed.

== See also ==
- Nebraska State Guard
