= Ryland Homes =

Home construction company

The Ryland Group, Inc.
- Industry: Home construction
- Founded: 1967; 59 years ago
- Fate: Merged into CalAtlantic Homes
- Headquarters: Westlake Village, California
- Key people: Larry T. Nicholson, President & CEO
- Revenue: ▲$2.615 billion (2018)
- Net income: ▼$0.176 billion (2018)
- Total assets: ▲$3.052 billion (2018)
- Total equity: ▲$1.085 billion (2018)
- Number of employees: 1,502 (2014)

The Ryland Group, Inc. was a company engaged in home construction based in Westlake Village, California. In 2015, it was the 5th largest homebuilder in the United States. In October 2015, the company merged with Standard Pacific Homes to form CalAtlantic Homes.

In addition to homebuilding, Ryland provided financial services such as consumer mortgage loans, title, and escrow services.

Ryland was not generally engaged in land development. The company bought finished land lots ready for building, or entered into land development joint ventures with partners.

== History ==
James P. Ryan left Pittsburgh, Pennsylvania-based Ryan Homes in 1967 to form the James P. Ryan Company in Columbia, Maryland. In 1968, the company built 220 homes at an average price of $30,000.

In 1970, Ryan noticed a "Maryland" sign with the initial "M" and "A" covered, and shortly thereafter the company changed its name to The Ryland Group, Inc.

In 1971, the company expanded to Atlanta and became a public company via an initial public offering, raising $4.6 million.

In 1977, the company built its 10,000th home.

In 1978, Ryland acquired Crest Communities, based in Cincinnati, Ohio, a company led by James Ryan's younger brother William Ryan, thereby entering the mortgage loan business.

In 1986, the company acquired M.J. Brock and Sons of California for $85 million and became the first homebuilder to have operations on both the East Coast of the United States and the West Coast of the United States.

In 1987, Jim Ryan retired from the company.

In 1998, it sold 9,430 houses in 252 communities in 18 states, at an average price of $182,000. That year it acquired Regency Communities of Tampa and exited the markets of Portland, Oregon, Salt Lake City, and the Philadelphia metropolitan area.

In July 2012, the company acquired the Charlotte and Raleigh operations and assets of Timberstone Homes.

In July 2013, the company acquired Cornell Homes, one of the largest private homebuilders in the Philadelphia market.

In October 2015, the company merged with Standard Pacific Homes to form CalAtlantic Homes. CalAtlantic was acquired by Lennar in 2018.

== Criticism ==
=== Requirement to use the company for mortgages ===
In 2007, the company was sued in federal court in Atlanta for allegedly forcing buyers to obtain mortgages through the company or pay an additional material fee to use an outside mortgage provider.

=== Failure to disclose land use history ===
In 2011, the company paid $1.2 million to settle a lawsuit that alleged the company failed to disclose that 118 homes in the Newport subdivision, near Orlando, Florida, were built on or near the former Pinecastle Jeep bombing range. The plaintiffs alleged that their property values declined when live bombs were found on site.
