= Brookfield Residential =

Canadian real estate developer

Brookfield Residential Properties Inc.
- Company type: Subsidiary
- Industry: Real estate development Construction
- Founded: March 31, 2011; 15 years ago
- Headquarters: Calgary, Alberta, Canada
- Key people: Alan Norris (chairman & CEO)
- Total assets: $5.7 billion
- Total equity: $1.6 billion
- Number of employees: 950 (2013)
- Parent: Brookfield Asset Management
- Website: brookfieldresidential.com

Brookfield Residential Properties Inc. is a Canadian real estate developer that has its headquarters in Calgary, Alberta. Total assets were $4.5 billion as of June 2018.

== History ==
Brookfield Residential was founded in 1956. Brookfield Residential Properties Inc. was formed on March 31, 2011, when Brookfield Homes Corporation ("Brookfield Homes") and Brookfield Office Properties (consisting of Carma Developers and Brookfield Homes (Ontario) Limited) merged.

In 2015, Brookfield Asset Management purchased 32.4 million common shares of Brookfield Residential in a privatization effort.

In March 2015, Brookfield Residential Properties announced the acquisition of Grand Haven Homes, an Austin, Texas, homebuilder. In October 2015, Brookfield Residential purchased builder Albi Homes. That year Brookfield Residential Properties participated in an initiative with other home builders, and the Government of Alberta to create affordable housing for homeless Calgarians.

In 2017, Brookfield Residential Properties constructed a passive house in an effort to educate its trade suppliers on construction methods to meet Passive House Institute standards.

In February 2018, it acquired some of the assets of San Diego–based real estate company OliverMcMillan, a developer of large-scale mixed use properties. Brookfield Residential Properties was awarded the 2018 Lowest HERS Index Score Canadian Production Builder with a HERS Index Score of 38 as part of the 2018 RESNET Cross Border Home Builder Challenge, which helps promote the utilization of the HERS Index.

On September 14, 2018, Calgary's Seton YMCA was renamed Brookfield Residential YMCA at Seton after a $3.5 million investment In August 2020, Brookfield Residential became one of the first victims of the DarkSide hacking group, leading to the stolen data being published on the dark web.
