= Precision Response Corporation =

- Founded: 1982
- Founder: Mark J. Gordon and David Epstein
- Services: outsourced call centers
- Number of employees: 11,000 total 2,000 in South Florida
- Parent: Alorica

Precision Response Corporation (PRC) is primarily an operator of outsourced call centers. Precision Response Corporation was the fifth largest employer in Miami-Dade County in 2007 with over 6,000 employees.

The company was founded by Mark J. Gordon and David Epstein in 1982. Gordon and Epstein took the company public in 1996. In 2000 they sold PRC to USA Networks for $728 million. At the time of its acquisition PRC was a listed company on NASDAQ as PRRC. PRC has call centers in Miami, India, and the Philippines. USA Networks, Inc. was a diversified media and electronic commerce company with assets that included USA Cable, Home Shopping Network, and Ticketmaster.

In 2001 PRC, a division of USA Networks, was located in Ft. Lauderdale and had 11,000 employees total. In 2002 PRC was named recipient of the First Annual Beacon Council Award. At that time they had over 5,000 employees in Miami-Dade county and ranked as among the top 10 employers in the county. The call center is in Miami-Dade and the headquarters is in Ft. Lauderdale.

In 2010 Alorica acquired PRC, expanding its service offerings and establishing itself as the largest minority business enterprise (MBE) in the outsourced customer contact center industry in the U.S. In August 2011 it was reported that PRC founder David Epstein has reentered the call center business with a company called C3. It is located in Plantation, FL and has 52 employees at its headquarters. Rival PRC now has a Florida workforce of 2000.
