= Global Crossing Airlines =

Charter airline of the United States

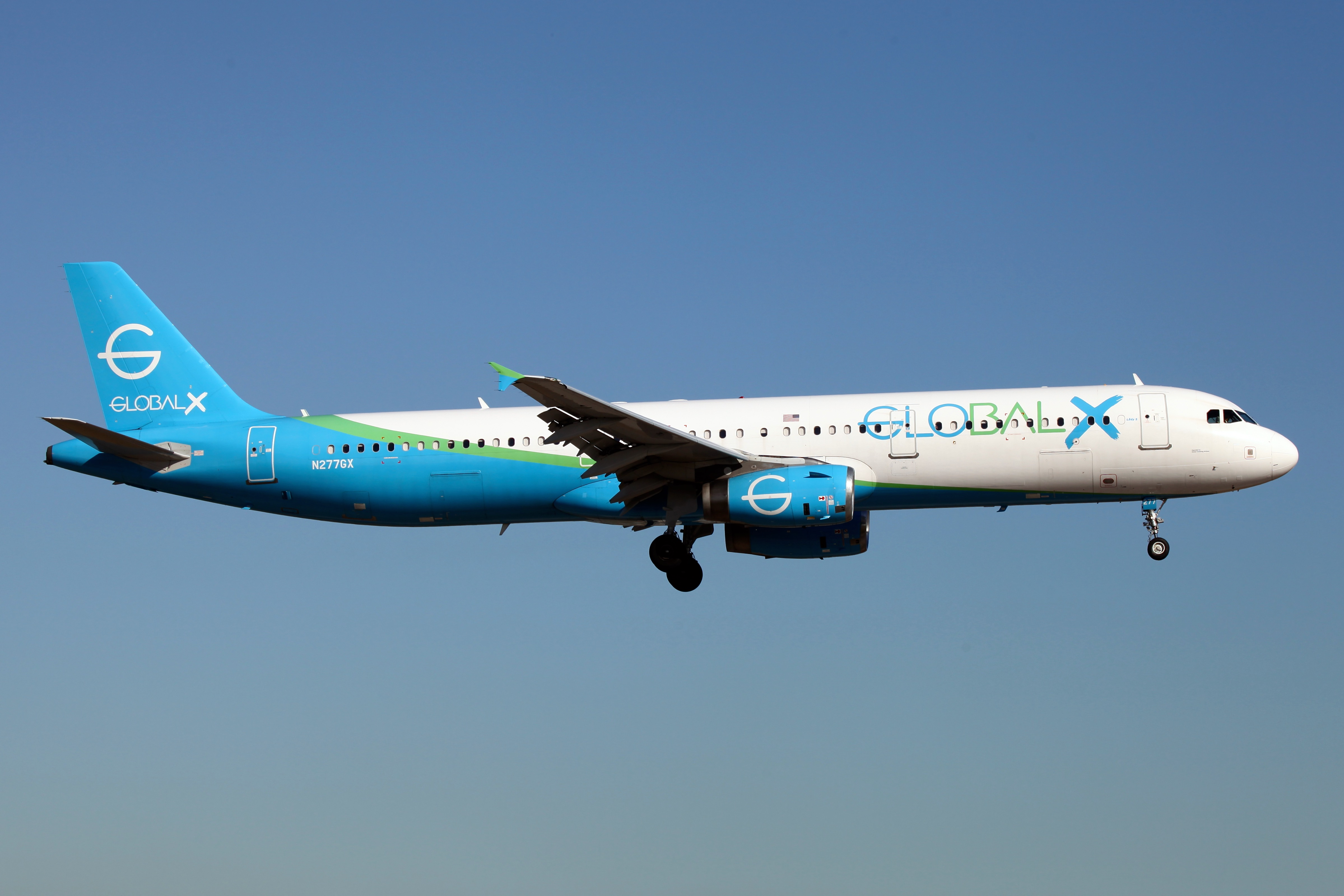
IATA	ICAO	Call sign
G6	GXA	GEMINI
- Founded: September 5, 2018; 8 years ago
- Commenced operations: August 7, 2021; 5 years ago
- AOC #: GCXA466Q
- Operating bases: Alexandria; Harlingen; Miami; Phoenix/Mesa
- Fleet size: 18
- Traded as: Cboe: JET
- ISIN: US37960G4010
- Headquarters: Miami, Florida, United States
- Key people: Chris Jamroz (Executive Chairman); Ryan Goepel (President & CFO)
- Revenue: ▲US$246 million (2025)
- Net income: ▲ −US$3.05 million (2025)
- Website: globalairlinesgroup.com

Global Crossing Airlines, Inc. (operating as GlobalX Airlines) is an American Part 121 domestic, flag, and supplemental charter airline headquartered in Miami, Florida. GlobalX operates the majority of deportation flights on behalf of U.S. Immigration and Customs Enforcement. This includes contracts by the Donald Trump administration where GlobalX planes deport immigrants to the Terrorism Confinement Center, a maximum security mega-prison in El Salvador.

The airline was founded in 2018 by Ed Wegel, who previously co-founded the reincarnated Eastern Air Lines. The airline provides ad hoc and scheduled passenger, charter, and cargo airlift to destinations throughout the United States, Europe, the Caribbean, and Latin America.

== History ==
In 2020, GlobalX completed a merger and spin-out with Canada Jetlines, an ultra low-cost airline headquartered in Mississauga, Ontario. In late 2020, GlobalX formed CubaX, a tour operator that provides weekly non-stop flights from Miami to Havana, Cuba. In 2021, CubaX began operating daily charter flights using GlobalX aircraft on behalf of Havana Air.

=== Deportations ===
GlobalX began operating deportation flights in 2024, and has handled more than half of deportation flights in 2024 and 2025. It operates many transfer flights of migrants within the United States, and immigration lawyers say these transfer flights have made it difficult to track their clients.

In January 2025, a flight operated by GlobalX transporting shackled deported migrants from the United States to Brazil experienced repeated technical problems, including struggles to take off, broken air conditioning, and an unscheduled landing due to technical issues. During the flight, multiple people fainted from heat exhaustion. The conditions on the flight led to diplomatic tensions between the United States and Brazil, with Brazilian government ministers describing the handling of the deportees on the flight as "unacceptable" and "degrading".

GlobalX handled several controversial flights in March 2025. On March 15, three GlobalX flights, aircraft tail numbers N278GX, N837VA, and N630VA, were used to transport Venezuelan nationals being held at El Valle Detention Center in Raymondville, Texas. The deportation flights traveled from Harlingen, Texas, to Honduras, where the plane sat on the tarmac for three hours before taking off again for El Salvador. There, the prisoners were transferred to Salvadoran custody and imprisonment. On March 20, GlobalX operated a flight to bring hundreds of Venezuelans to El Salvador, despite a federal judge blocking the flight.

An investigative article by ProPublica, published April 1, 2025, reported concerns for passenger safety by flight attendants on GlobalX detainee flights chartered by Immigration Customs and Enforcement (ICE). The attendants were concerned about how they would be able to evacuate aircraft in the event of an emergency given that the passengers were handcuffed and shackled.

On April 16, GlobalX's executive chairman, Chris Jamroz, resigned from the board of directors of the Royal Ontario Museum after his links to the deportation flights were reported on by Canadian independent journalist Rachel Gilmore.

On May 5, 404 Media reported that the airline's computer systems had been hacked and its website defaced by the hacker group Anonymous. The individuals claiming to be the hackers provided 404 Media with flight records and passenger manifests from January 19 through May 1, 2025, and 404 Media reported that the data matched other publicly-available records. The hackers claimed that they accessed an Amazon Web Services account belonging to the airline, with 404 Media reporting that "The hacker told 404 Media they managed to find a token belonging to a GlobalX developer. They then used that to find access and secret keys for GlobalX's AWS instances which contained the data." GlobalX later filed a report with the SEC confirming the attack, though it did not confirm or deny the claim that data was leaked.

=== Airline agreements ===
On January 14, 2025, GlobalX announced an electronic interline agreement with United Airlines regarding cargo space on their Chicago–San Juan route through the online platform Airblox.

== Fleet ==
=== Current ===
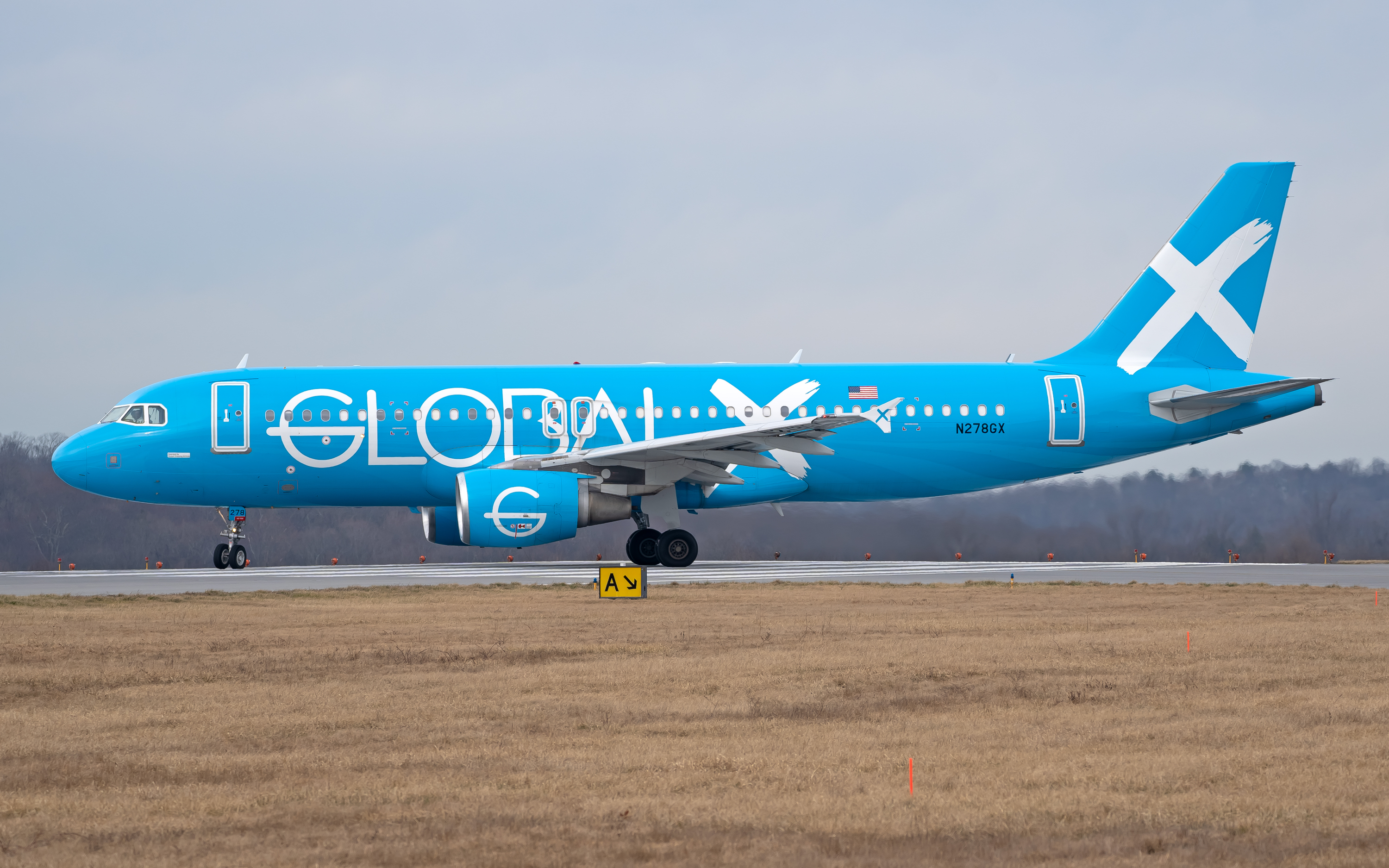
A GlobalX Airbus A320-200 with an alternate blue livery.

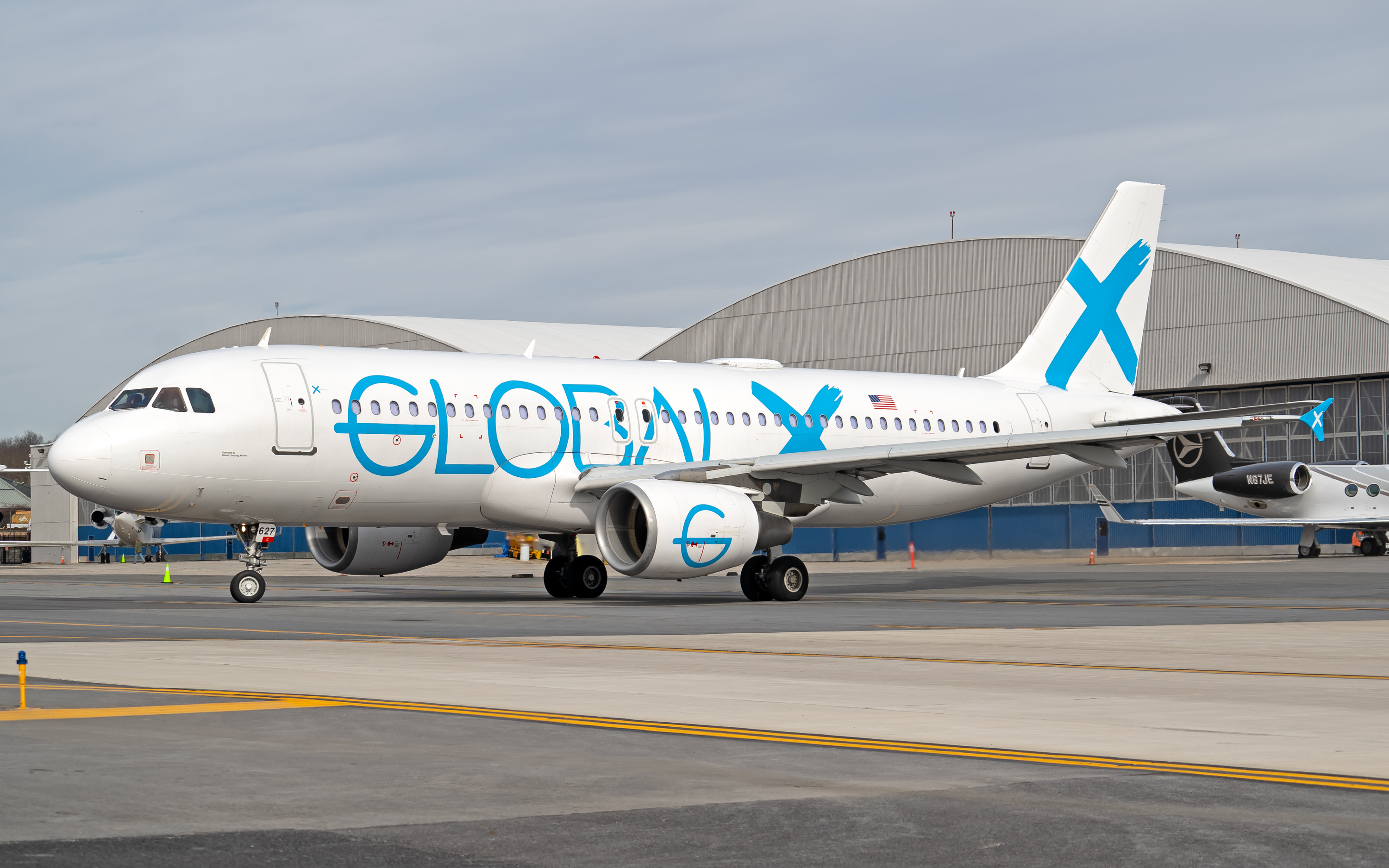
Another GlobalX Airbus A320-200 with an alternate white livery.

As of August 2025, GlobalX operated the following aircraft:

GlobalX fleet
Aircraft	In service	Orders	Passengers				Notes
Aircraft	In service	Orders	B	P	E	Total	Notes
Airbus A320-200	10	—	68	–	–	68	
Airbus A320-200	10	—	12	24	114	150	
Airbus A320-200	10	—	–	–	179	179	
Airbus A320-200	10	—	–	–	180	180	
Airbus A320-200	10	—	–	24	156	180	
Airbus A321-200	4	–	12	22	149	183	
Airbus A321-200	4	–	–	–	200	200	
Airbus A321-200	4	–	–	–	210	210	
XCargo fleet
Airbus A321-200P2F	4	–	Cargo				
Total	18	—					

=== Former ===
Aircraft	Total	Introduced	Retired	Notes
Airbus A319-100	1	2023	2025	

== See also ==
- Avelo Airlines
- CSI Aviation
- List of airlines of the United States
- List of companies based in Miami
- Transportation in the United States
