= Amdahl 470V =

Family of large mainframe computers

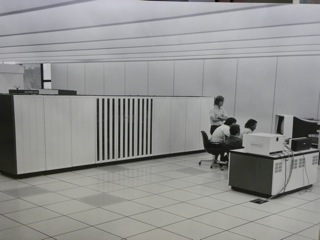
- Amdahl 470V/6 at the University of Michigan
- Also known as: M-190
- Developer: Amdahl Corporation
- Manufacturer: Amdahl, Fujitsu, Hitachi
- Product family: System/360
- Type: Mainframe computer
- Released: June 1, 1975; 51 years ago
- Discontinued: 1981; 45 years ago
- Media: tape; DASDs; paper tape; printed paper; punched cards
- Operating system: BOS/360; TOS/360; DOS/360; OS/360; TSS/360
- Memory: 8 MB – 32 MB (dynamic RAM)
- Successor: Amdahl 580

The Amdahl 470V was a family of large mainframe computers designed by Amdahl Corporation and manufactured in partnership with Fujitsu. The design was plug compatible with IBM's System/370 series machines, but offered higher performance at a lower cost. The line was officially announced in September 1974, and it remained Amdahl's primary product into the 1980s.

The first machine in the series was the V/6, aimed at IBM's highest-end model, the 370 Model 168. The first installation was at the Goddard Space Flight Center in June 1975. The V/6 ran about 1.5 times as fast as the Model 168, and about 2 times as fast as the Model 165 it replaced at Goddard. The systems were also one-third the size of the Model 168 and were air-cooled, making them significantly simpler to install and operate than the water-cooled IBM systems; the system at Goddard was installed and commissioned in days instead of weeks. The V/6 was also sold in Japan starting in 1976 by both Fujitsu and Hitachi, where it was known as the M-190 and ran non-IBM operating systems like OSIV that provided backward compatibility with older Japanese mainframe designs.

The release of the 470 was initially ignored by IBM as it was believed Amdahl could not make a profit selling only a CPU. When 470 sales started rapidly increasing, IBM responded in March 1977 with the IBM 3033, which would have performance similar to the V/6 and would be roughly half the size of the Model 168. Amdahl responded the same month by announcing the low-end V/5 and midrange V/7, allowing them to cover the entire 370 family. The 3033 was a huge success, so much so that IBM could not deliver them fast enough and pushed some deliveries back into 1980. Amdahl responded in October 1978 by announcing the high-end V/8, even faster than the 3033. This drove some customers to cancel their 3033 orders and move to the V/8 instead.

Design of a replacement series began in 1979, with Fujitsu favoring multiprocessor systems while Gene Amdahl wanted to produce more powerful single processors. When Fujitsu took over management control, Amdahl left the company in 1979 to form Trilogy Systems. The new multiprocessor systems were announced in 1980 as the Amdahl 580. New entries in the 580 series replaced models in the 470 until the switchover was complete by the mid-1980s.

== History ==
=== ACS ===
IBM introduced its first supercomputer, the IBM 7030 Stretch, in May 1961. They had to withdraw it from the market when tests at the launch customer, Los Alamos Scientific Laboratory, demonstrated it had very poor real-world performance. Almost immediately, IBM organized two development projects, Project X at the IBM Poughkeepsie Laboratory and Project Y at the IBM Thomas J. Watson Research Center. Project X was tasked with designing a machine that would run 10 times as fast as Stretch, while Y was to be 100 times faster.

At the same time, IBM was designing its new mainstream system, with the underlying concept that it would allow any program to run on a range of machines from small office systems to top-end supercomputers. Project X was redirected to form the high-end of this lineup, and would emerge as the System/360 Model 91. Gene Amdahl had been a major driving force during the creation of the System/360 machines in the early 1960s, and he became known as the "father of the 360". The 360 would go on to be one of the most successful mainframe computer designs in history, cementing IBM's place as the number one computer vendor. Amdahl had only taken on the 360 project after IBM agreed to allow him to return to the west coast after five to seven months. That did not turn out; he stayed on the East Coast for a total of four years during the 360 effort. With no immediate projects that interested him, he left to teach at Stanford University for a term.

During this period he was named an IBM Fellow which allowed him to work on any project that interested him. Around the same time, IBM decided to move the Project Y effort, now known as the IBM ACS to a new office in Menlo Park, near Stanford. Amdahl soon joined the ACS project. ACS was designing a machine dedicated to high-performance scientific tasks, and therefore, unlike Project X, it did not use the System/360 architecture. Shortly after joining, Amdahl began agitating for the ideas being developed for ACS as the basis of a much faster 360. This angered ACS management, who banished him and assigned an unruly employee to be his only staff. The two then developed the faster 360 and began telling everyone else in the company about it.

This process eventually led to a "shootout" between the two concepts. Amdahl was able to demonstrate that one could build a machine that would offer about 10% less performance than the baseline ACS but with only one-half the complexity and cost. Whether this is true remains debated to this day, but it did convince management, and the original ACS was killed in favor of Amdahl's ACS/360. The design was complete by 1969, at which time Amdahl outlined a plan for three machines, the original ACS/360, a simpler system roughly 1/3 the performance, and an even smaller machine about 1/9. Due to the improvements in the design, even the smallest machine would still be faster than the fastest member of the existing 360 lineup. Management rejected the plan, and Amdahl responded by suggesting they simply shut down the lab, which they did.

=== New concept ===
While all of this was happening, IBM was embroiled in a long-running anti-trust investigation. This included, among many issues, the fact that IBM bundled software with their machines, making it difficult for 3rd parties to sell software on those machines. In July 1969, IBM announced they would be releasing all of their earlier software into the public domain and all future software sales would be separate line items instead of bundled with their systems. This included the growing list of operating systems (OSes) for the 360s. Amdahl realized this meant that someone could build a 360-compatible machine and then buy the OS for it. IBM would not be allowed to stop them or they would immediately be attacked on anti-trust grounds.

Amdahl began thinking about a design using a simplified version of the ACS's physical packaging to make what he believed would be a much less expensive system. ACS had been attempting to package everything as tightly as possible using newly emerging chip manufacturing techniques. Amdahl noted that the majority of hardware failures were in the chips, and that by packing them so tightly it made it difficult to replace a broken component. He developed the idea of a less dense packaging that would make interconnections between them easier to build. To make up for the larger size this would normally require, the chips themselves would have about 100 gates on them, instead of the more typical 30.

They would then make up for the lower density by highly automating the production and assembly using individual circuit boards with a small number of components on them. Unlike the high-end 360 models which were also densely packed and had to be water-cooled, these systems would offer even better performance while being air-cooled. This would make them less costly to operate, as well as much smaller, saving the customers so much on infrastructure and operational costs that they would be able to sell their systems at roughly the same price as IBM and still be highly competitive and profitable.

=== Pricing trap ===
In early 1970, Amdahl told management that he would be leaving and that he planned to set up a company to produce 360-compatible systems. As he left, the president of his division took him aside and gave him the advice that there was no money in high-end machines. This was the case for IBM, whose high-end systems always had marginal economics or even lost money.

Amdahl was convinced the problem was not part of the computers themselves, but part of IBM's business model. IBM's sales pitch was that you could buy triple performance for double the cost. This was a powerful incentive to buy a 360, as the customers could buy a low-end machine and then trade up if they needed more power. Since the low-end systems would be the largest sellers, they set the price on those systems to generate the desired profit. This forced the higher-end systems to have a particular price no matter what it cost to actually build them, and that price was too low to maintain the same profits.

This problem simply didn't exist if there was only a single machine in the lineup, all that mattered is whether you could build it profitably at whatever price point you selected. In Amdahl's case, this was the high-end, which he felt he could produce at a lower cost and thus generate higher profits. If IBM lowered the price of their high-end to match Amdahl's, they would be forced to lower the price of the lower-end systems to maintain their pricing tiers, losing profit on their biggest sellers. He felt they were trapped by their pricing strategy, and would not be able to match him.

At first, IBM did not take this threat seriously because they did not believe such a business could generate a profit given that much of their own income was from peripherals and software, and all of that would still be going to IBM. Also, unknown to Amdahl, they were also working on new systems that would soon be announced as System/370 that offered some of the same size and cooling advantages.

=== Forming the company ===
Amdahl had considerable trouble raising capital, as venture firms felt there was no way anyone could compete with IBM. RCA had spent millions developing and marketing their Spectra 70 series of 360-compatible designs, and had yet to make a profit. General Electric and Xerox were also in the mainframe space, but all three companies gave up during the time Amdahl was looking for funding, selling their lines to smaller companies at a huge loss.

Amdahl managed to raise two million dollars, which was enough for the design phase, but funding for development and production could not be found. This changed due to Amdahl's longstanding relationship with Fujitsu's engineers. Fujitsu had its own line of mainframes that sold mostly in Japan and they had made no headway in other markets. They sent a team, including their head engineer, to meet with Amdahl's team, which included 22 other ACS alumni. After three days of intense meetings, their chief engineer finally stood up and said "That's enough, we're convinced."

Fujitsu agreed to invest five million dollars in the project. This prompted a surprise investment of another five million from Heinz Nixdorf. Concerned this might dilute their position, Fujitsu immediately invested another five million. Now fully capitalized, Amdahl Corporation was formally incorporated in 1971.

Some time in 1974 or '75, an anonymous paper circulated in Washington claiming that the Japanese and German investments in the new company was a way for those countries to gain access to the world-leading technology and take over the high-end computing field. This raised enough concern that Amdahl was called to Washington to explain himself. Amdahl pointed out that there was simply no other funding available in the US due to the overwhelming presence of IBM, and had they not invested in his company, they would invest in some non-US company and thus the US would lose the performance lead. He also noted that the arrangement with the Germans was just a sales arrangement, they had no interest in production outside white-labeling, while the Japanese were limited to certain performance levels that locked them out of the high end market. His arguments won the day. He maintained that the memo was written by IBM or one of its legal firms.

=== Development and release ===
The cooling system of the Amdahl design was key to its success. Here we see a card from the later 580 series, but the 470's arrangement of chips with a finned heat sink was typical of the 470 as well.

The original concept was to use a standardized circuit board with a five-by-five grid where individual components could be placed. The wiring between them was automatically laid out by a program running on the small IBM 1130 industrial computer. These boards would then be mass-produced and the components assembled into them. During the design phase the boards were redesigned to be slightly larger, six-by-seven, but the concept was otherwise unchanged.

Amdahl first approached National Semiconductor (NatSemi) to manufacture the ICs. They sent a huge group to the presentations, and after learning everything they could about the concept, revealed they never had an interest in producing the chips and were there just to learn about the state of the art in ECL design. (Note: In his interview with Wagner, Amdahl relates the same story, but states the company is Fairchild Semiconductor, not NatSemi.) Amdahl next went to Texas Instruments who told them everything they were doing was wrong. Motorola was interested, but only if Amdahl agreed to give them their layout software. Amdahl felt that they would drop the effort as soon as they got the software, and demanded to see some chips first, which never arrived. In the end, they worked with Advanced Memory Systems, a small company that had produced successful CMOS and ECL memory chips and was looking for new projects.

The system was originally known as the 470, because it was one better than the 370, which had been announced in 1970. The first model would be the 470/6, a high-end system designed to significantly outperform the 370/165. In the summer of 1972, IBM announced that they would be adding virtual memory support to the 370 line. Shortly thereafter, Amdahl announced they would do the same for their system, which would now be known as the 470V/6.

Fujitsu developed the cooling system, which consisted of cylindrical finned heat sinks not unlike the cooling fins seen on the cylinders of air-cooled engines like those on motorcycles. These came in several sizes depending on the cooling needs of the integrated circuits (ICs) and were attached to the top of them, standing vertically off the top of the cards. Large fans pulled air across the cards.

Several delays followed, largely due to manufacturing issues, and the system was not ready for customer delivery until 1975. The first machine was delivered to NASA Goddard in June 1975 and commissioned in a remarkably short five days, compared to a typical two to three weeks needed for a high-end 370 system. (Note: There is some confusion over what system the 470 replaced, sources describe it as a 360/165 (which does not exist), a 370/165, and even a 370/168, which seems unlikely given they have only just started shipping. Another possibility is that it was a 360/65, a former high end model, and the additional 1 is a typo.) Contemporary independent benchmarking demonstrated the Amdahl's performance claims were true; the machine consistently delivered 1.5 to 2 times the speed of the IBM 370/168. It was also slightly cheaper; a system with 16 channels, console, and 1 MB of RAM sold for $3,750,000.

Systems were delivered at a rate of about one a month for the rest of the year. Sales picked up and soon they were averaging four a month, and by 1977, six a month. Installations of the Japanese models, the FACOM M-190, began in 1976 with a delivery to Japan Gasoline.

=== Later models ===
It appeared that the new system was going to be a success, and IBM finally took notice. They ran a number of scenarios to see if the concept could work and concluded that a company could indeed make a profit selling just the CPUs. The company decided on a two-pronged response; one would be to quickly introduce new systems that were more competitive, which would emerge as the IBM 303X series. The second approach was to develop a new system instruction set architecture (ISA) where high-level commands like "open file" and "find record in table" would be implemented in microcode and thus the operating system would not run on a machine unless it also copied IBM's microcode, which could be copyrighted.

When Amdahl's financial results for 1976 were seen at IBM in early 1977, they found that the company made 30% pre-tax profit, the same as IBM. They responded by announcing the 303X series in March 1977. The first of lineup, the IBM 3033, was roughly double the performance of the 370/168, making it slightly faster than the V/6, and was priced 30% cheaper than the 370/168 to make it compete more closely with the V/6. It still required water cooling and more power, so cost-of-ownership was still in Amdahl's favor. The new machines had minor architectural changes to reach these goals, along with larger caches and more memory.

Amdahl went to Fujitsu and suggested that the architectural changes could be easily duplicated, and that they could be more effective in sales if they had some lower cost options as well. Fujitsu agreed, and the same month they announced their own new machines, the 470V/5 and 470V/7. These matched the IBM 370 low-end and mid-range offerings, respectively, while keeping their sales advantage of being somewhat faster and somewhat cheaper. The V/5 was simply a less-expensive version of the V/6 with half the cache and fewer channel controllers, but the V/7 was a newer design implementing the sorts of changes IBM had used in the 3033. The V/5 and V/6 later saw minor upgrades to the V/5-II and V/6-II. The V/5 and V/6 were based on the same hardware, and a V/5 could be field-upgraded to a V/6, and later to the V/5-II or V/6-II. Despite lowering prices to match IBM's moves, the company continued to be able to generate 30% profits.

IBM released additional members of the 303X series over the next two years, with Amdahl doing the same in order to have a machine aimed at every member of the 303X lineup. The original V/6 architecture was abandoned during this period, and all of these updated systems were based on the V/7 hardware. The 7A was announced in August 1979, the 7B in November, and the 7C in November 1980. By the 1980s, the line consisted of the series of V/7 sub-models and the single V/8 model. Each of these was aimed at a specific IBM model, the 7 against the 3038B, the 7A against the 3033N, the 7B against the 3038E, 7C against the 3033S and the 8 against the 3038J.

By 1980, over 200 machines of all models had been sold, and by 1983 this had increased to over 700.

=== Replacing the 470 ===
As MOS steadily improved through the early 1980s and VLSI was emerging, mainframe computers could no longer offer the best performance, let alone price/performance. For instance, the Motorola 68020, a 32-bit system that supported virtual memory, was launched in 1984 and offered 4.85 MIPS at a 16 MHz clock speed, faster than the V/6. It cost only $487, and complete systems were available for several thousand dollars. While the mainframe machines also had additional resources like massive (for the era) hard drives and the performance of the channel controllers to greatly improve overall throughput, it was clear to many that these areas would also be taken over by commodity VLSI components by the 90s. Companies scrambled for solutions to allow them to continue selling their high-end systems.

For Amdahl, this resulted in a fight between Gene Amdahl who wanted to build single-processor machines with higher performance, and Fujitsu, who thought multi-processor systems were the solution. The majority of the engineering staff sided with Fujitsu, leading Gene to leave the company. Gene formed Trilogy Systems in 1980. The success of Amdahl allowed him to raise significant capital, and Trilogy's $230 million initial round was the largest in silicon valley to that point. The new Amdahl 580 series was announced in November 1980, and first shipped during August 1982. The 480 line was rapidly run down after this point.

== Description ==
=== Basic architecture ===
All of the systems had a similar physical architecture, using custom bipolar large scale integration (LSI) integrated circuits for the main logic, a bipolar processor cache, and MOS dynamic RAM for main memory. The CPU was logically organized in four units, the Storage Unit that controls accesses to main memory and includes both virtual memory hardware and the cache; the Instruction Unit for decoding and dispatching instructions; an Execution Unit that is the main arithmetic logic unit (ALU); and a Channel Unit that performs I/O. Systems could have between 8 and 32 channel controllers in the Channel Unit, depending on the model, and had physical and logical interfaces that were identical to those in the 360 and 370, allowing any IBM equipment to be simply plugged in and operate.

All of the processor units were independently pipelined, allowing them to retire one instruction for every two clock cycles. The SU had a two-level virtual memory system, or "Dynamic Address Translation" as it was known in IBM terminology. In the original systems, the translation lookaside buffer (TLB) had 256 entries, but this was supported by a "segment table origin" cache which grouped the different execution unit's (roughly equivalent to "program" or "environment" in modern terms) with another 32 entries. The V/7 and 8 increased these to 512 and 128 entries, respectively.

Main memory was interleaved, either 2 or 4-way in early machines depending on how much memory was installed, or 4-way in later models like the V/7 and V/8. The V/7C was unique in that it used 8 or 16-way depending on the amount of memory. Interleaved memory spread values across different banks of the DRAM, allowing sequential reads to be much faster. For instance, on the V/7 using 4-way interleaving on a CPU with a 28.5 ns cycle time and memory with a 290 ns cycle. By spreading subsequent addresses across 4 banks, the system can read the next byte of a 4-byte value from the next bank immediately, instead of having to wait for the first DRAM to complete a full cycle.

=== Versions and updates ===
The original V/6 shipped with a minimum of 4 megabytes of memory, and could be field upgraded in 2 MB units up to 8 MB. The V/6 had an overall machine cycle speed of 32.5 ns (30.8 MHz) which gave it performance around 3.5 MIPS. The 16 kB cache had a 65 ns access time (two CPU cycles), while the MOS main memory was much slower, 325 ns, so the large cache had a large effect on overall performance.

The V/6-II, announced in February 1977, was a relatively minor refresh, adding a larger 32 kB cache. The V/5-II, announced the next month, was essentially a renamed original V/5 with the smaller 16 kB cache at a new lower price point. A kit was offered to owners of the V/6 to upgrade them to the 6-II, and another allowed the V/5 to become a V/6, and later a V/6-II.

The V/7 was a bigger update with higher performance, about 2.1 to 2.4 times the speed of a 360/168, compared to 1.4 to 1.6 for the original V/6. It increased the processor clock speed to 29 ns and cache to 58 ns, and the main memory improved slighly to 290 ns. It also increased the maximum memory to 16 MB. The V/8 was bump of the basic V/7 system, with another slight update of the clock to 26 ns and a larger 64 kB cache with a 52 ns access time, providing about 2.6 to 3.0 times the performance of the 360/168. Later models, all based on the V/7, were packaging rearrangements that provided different amounts of expansion capacity.

The following table summarizes the features of the various models, ordered by name, not introduction date. The estimated performance for the earlier models is well recorded in various sources, but the later models have been calculated from the relative performance figures in DataPro and the measured performance of the IBM system they are comparing to. The pricing is a mix of actual values from the references, as well as calculated values based on relative pricing where a specific value is not mentioned (ie, "$250,000 lower than..."). The prices have not been adjusted for inflation.

Specification	470V/5	470V/5-II	470V/6	470V/6-II	470V/7	470V/7A	470V/7B	470V/7C	470V/8
Date introduced	3/77	10/78	9/74	2/77	3/77	8/79	11/79	11/80	10/78
First delivery	9/77	4/79	6/75	8/77	8/78	9/79	3/80	Q3 1981	9/79
Introductory price	~$2.43M	~$1.9M	~$3.0M	~$3.28M	~$3.48M	~$1.38M	~$1.23M	~$1.15M	~$1.93M
Processor cycle (ns)	32.5	32.5	32.5	32.5	28.5	28.5	28.5	28.5	26
Estimated performance (MIPS)	~2.1	~2.3	~3.0–3.5	~3.5	~5.5	~4.5	~3.5	~2.7	~6.5–6.9
Main storage cycle (ns)	325	325	325	325	290	290	290	320	260
Bytes fetched/cycle	4	4	4	4	4	4	4	4	4
Interleaving	2/4-way	2/4-way	2/4-way	2/4-way	4-way	4-way	4-way	8/16-way	4-way
Minimum memory	4 MB	4 MB	4 MB	4 MB	4 MB	4 MB	4 MB	4 MB	4 MB
Maximum memory	8 MB	8 MB	8 MB	8 MB	16 MB	16 MB	8 MB	16 MB	16 MB
Memory increment	2 MB	2 MB	2 MB	2 MB	4 MB	4 MB	4 MB	4 MB	4 MB
TLB	256 entries	256 entries	256 entries	256 entries	512 entries	512 entries	512 entries	512 entries	512 entries
STO stack	32 entries	32 entries	32 entries	32 entries	128 entries	128 entries	128 entries	128 entries	128 entries
Instruction lookahead	4 levels	4 levels	4 levels	4 levels	4 levels	4 levels	4 levels	4 levels	4 levels
HSB cycle (ns)	65	65	65	65	57	57	57	58	52
HSB capacity	16 KB	32 KB	16 KB	32 KB	32 KB	32 KB	32 KB	32 KB	64 KB
Standard I/O channels	8	8	8	8	12	8	8	8	12
Optional I/O channels	4/8	4/8	4/8	4/8	4	4/8	4/8	8	4
Upgrade path	/5-II, /6, /6-II	/6-II	—	—	/8	/7	/7A	/7B	—
