= Magnuson Computer Systems =

Manufacturer of plug-compatible computers

- Industry: Computers
- Founded: 1977; 48 years ago
- Defunct: March 1983
- Products: Bankruptcy

Magnuson Computer Systems was a manufacturer of plug-compatible computers compatible with IBM mainframes. The Magnuson M80 range was available from the late 1970s and was successful when IBM struggled to ship machines. The company declared bankruptcy in March 1983 after IBM introduced new models and reduced prices.

The Magnuson processors were aimed at the lower end of IBM's product line. They had a number of unique design features. Perhaps the most notable was the voting logic on each processor card. All of the slots in the main chassis were interchangeable. All slots were filled on only the high-end model.

Carlton Amdahl, son of Gene Amdahl, was Vice President of Engineering at Magnuson. He went on to work with his father at Trilogy Systems. There the "tell me three times" logic was incorporated into their chip designs at the level of individual gates and flip-flops.

== See also ==
- Amdahl Corporation
- Trilogy Systems
