= Amdahl UTS =

UTS (Universal Timesharing System)
- Developer: Amdahl Corporation / UTS Global
- OS family: Unix SVR4
- Working state: Discontinued
- Initial release: May 1981; 45 years ago
- Latest release: UTS 4.5
- Available in: English
- Supported platforms: IBM mainframes (and compatible)
- Default user interface: Command-line interface

UTS, short for Universal Timesharing System, is a discontinued implementation of the UNIX operating system for IBM mainframe (and compatible) computers. Amdahl created the first versions of UTS and released it in May 1981. It was the first native version of Unix for the System/360 mainframe family. UTS was commonly used with Amdahl's Multiple Domain Facility (MDF), which allowed UTS to run at the same time as the normal S/360 systems. As Unix marketshare grew in the 1990s, UTS allowed Amdahl to transition their focus from emulating S/360 systems to using the same hardware as the basis for very powerful Unix servers. Amdahl's exit from the mainframe business and eventual closure led to UTS being sold to UTS Global in 2002. UTS Global has since gone out of business.

== System requirements ==
UTS Release 4.5 supports the following S/390 model processors and their successors:

- Amdahl 5990, 5995A, 5995M series of ECL processors
- Amdahl Millennium Global Server series of CMOS processors
- Fujitsu Global Server
- IBM ES/9000/9021 series of ECL processors
- IBM G4, G5 & G6 Servers (the 9672 R and X series of CMOS processors)

== History ==
The UTS project had its origins in work started at Princeton University in 1975 to port UNIX to the IBM VM/370 system. Team members there were Tom Lyon, Joseph Skudlarek, Peter Eichenberger, and Eric Schmidt. Tom Lyon joined Amdahl in 1978, and by 1979 there was a full Version 6 Unix system on the Amdahl 470V being used internally for design automation engineering. In late 1979 this was updated to the more commonly ported Version 7.

In 1980 Amdahl announced support for Unix on the System 470. UTS (Universal Timesharing System) also ran on National Advanced Systems mainframes. Lyon said at USENIX in June 1981 that Amdahl had run UTS for 370 for two years internally, and unofficially distributed the operating system on request. One recipient was the Intel 80386 engineering team, which used UNIX as the design environment, so needed UTS for Intel's IBM mainframes. In 1985 IBM announced its own mainframe Unix, IX/370, as a competitive response to Amdahl.

From 1985 UTS was based on UNIX System V. In 1986 Amdahl announced UTS/580, the first version to optionally run bare metal on the IBM/370-compatible Amdahl 580 series; previous Unix ports, including IX/370, always ran as guest operating systems under the IBM VM hypervisor. Performance improved by 25% without VM, the company said. Version 4.5 was based on Unix System V, Release 4 (SVR4).

In 1987 Amdahl announced that it ended Aspen, a project started seven years earlier to create a proprietary operating system, and instead would focus on UTS. The 60 Aspen developers moved to UTS, for a total of 250 Amdahl developers on Unix. That year the company released version 1.2, and 2.0 in 1989. Version 2.0 supports 31-bit—matching MVS/XA's ability to address up to 2GB of main memory—and Network File System. The upgrade was available for free to the more than 200 customer sites; new customers paid $20,000 for installation. The monthly lease for UTS was $4,000 to $14,000 per month, depending on the customer's processors.

Version 4.1 appeared in August 1993, with a new pricing structure of $15-25,000 for initial licenses, and monthly fees of $2,700-$5,250.

== See also ==
- Linux on IBM Z
- OpenSolaris for System z
- UNIX System Services in OS/390 and its successors
- UNIX-RT
- RTLinux
