= WISC =

WISC may refer to:

- Wechsler Intelligence Scale for Children
- WISC-TV, a television station (channel 11, virtual 3) licensed to Madison, Wisconsin, United States
- Wisconsin, short form of Wisconsin
- Wisconsin Integrally Synchronized Computer
- Writable instruction set computer
- Wind and/or infrared sensitive collector, a type of uncovered hybrid photovoltaic/solar thermal collector
- University of Wisconsin–Madison
- Wisconsin Supreme Court
- West Indian Students' Centre, London
