= Ivor Catt =

British electronics engineer (1935–2025)

Ivor Catt (19 December 1935 – 21 June 2025) was a British electronics engineer known principally for his alternative theories of electromagnetism. He received a B.A. degree from Cambridge University and won the Electronic Design magazine's "best product of the year" award on 26 October 1989, after £16 million funding.

== Background ==
Catt was born in Devon, England and grew up on an RAF airbase in Singapore. He left the country, along with his mother and sister, just before the Japanese invasion in 1942. He did his National Service stationed in Germany. He won a State Scholarship in mathematics and then studied engineering at Trinity College, Cambridge.

Catt married Freda Mansfield in 1959. The couple had one son.

Catt died on 21 June 2025, aged 89.

== Wafer scale integration ==
Catt developed and patented some ideas on Wafer scale integration (WSI) in 1972, and published his work in Wireless World in 1981, after his articles on the topic were rejected by academic journals. The technique, christened Catt Spiral, was designed to enable the use of partially faulty integrated chips (called partials), which were otherwise discarded by manufacturers.

In the mid-1980s, a British company Anamartic, funded by Tandem Computers and Sir Clive Sinclair among others, announced plans to manufacture microchips ("superchips") based on Catt's technology. The approach was reported to be revolutionary at the time, with predictions that it would enable construction of powerful super-computers from cheap, mass-produced components, and cheaper and faster replacements for magnetic disk memories. Anamartic introduced a solid-state memory, called the Wafer Stack, based on the technology in 1989 and the device won Electronic Product's 'Product of the Year Award'. However the company could not ensure a large enough supply of silicon wafers, which were crucial for its chip manufacturing, and folded in 1992.

== Writings and opinions ==
=== On industrial management ===
Catt spent six years in the 1960s working in five different electronics companies in the USA. He was very disillusioned by his experience and wrote a harsh critique of American management practices in his book, The Catt Concept: The New Industrial Darwinism. Catt was critical of the hire and fire culture, which he labeled the New Social Darwinism, and accused American employers of stifling their workers' creativity. The book got largely negative reviews, with Kirkus Reviews describing it as a contrived and often muddled work that rested on "one man's bitter and limited experience." Published in six languages.

== Censorship claims ==
His work has received coverage and debate in the magazines Wireless World and Electronics World from December 1978 to September 1988. New Scientist on 19 February 1989 stated that Catt proposed an electronic internet to share ideas and circumvent bigoted censorship.

== Selected bibliography ==
=== Books ===
- The Catt Concept: The New Industrial Darwinism, Putnam, 1971, ISBN 0-906340-15-2
- Computer Worship, Pitman Publ., 1973 ISBN 0-273-00243-0
- Digital Hardware Design (with David Walton, Malcolm Davidson), Macmillan, 1979, ISBN 0-333-25981-5

=== Self-published ===
- Electromagnetic Theory, C.A.M. Pub., 1983, ISBN 0-906340-03-9
- Death of Electric Current: Wireless World Articles and Letters, C.A.M. Pub., 1987, ISBN 0-906340-06-3
- The Catt Anomaly: Science Beyond the Crossroads, Westfields, 2001, ISBN 0-906340-15-2
- The Hook and the Sting: The Legal Mafia, Westfields, 1996, 1996, ISBN 0-906340-09-8

=== Articles ===
- Lynch, Arnold and Ivor Catt, "A Difficulty in Electromagnetic Theory," presented to and published by the Institution of Electrical Engineers, Professional Group D7 (History of Technology), 26th Weekend Meeting, 10–12 July 1998, University of East Anglia, publication HEE/26
- Catt, I., The Two T.E.M. Signals, IEEE Computer Society, 1978, OCLC 35349268
- Catt, I., "The Rise and Fall of Bodies of Knowledge", The Information Scientist, 12 (4) December 1978, pp. 137–144
- Catt, I., Davidson, M., Walton, D.S.,"The history of displacement current," Wireless World, March 1979
- Catt, I., Davidson, M., Walton, D.S., "Displacement current", Wireless World, December 1978
- Catt, I., 'Crosstalk (Noise) in Digital Systems,' IEEE Trans. on Elect. Comp., vol. EC-16 (December 1967) pp. 749–58 .
- Catt, I., 'Death of Electric Current,' Wireless World, December 1980
- Catt, I., 'The End of the Road,' Electronics World, April 2013

=== Articles referring to Ivor Catt ===
- Cook, Nigel, "Air traffic control: how many more air disasters?", Electronics World, January 2003, pp. 12–17 [
- Cook, Nigel, "An Electronic Universe", Electronics World, Part 1: August 2002 (4 pages), Part 2: April 2003 (6 pages)
- "Depending on who[m] you talk to in the generally conservative semiconductor industry, Catt is either a crank or a visionary. For 20 years, he has been refining the theoretical foundations for a revolution in the semiconductor industry ...." – "On the importance of being creative; Innovative thinkers should be allowed to come to the fore", New Scientist, 12 June 1986, p35
- Sinclair, Sir Clive, "Sir Clive Sinclair talks on wafer-scale integration 1987" on YouTube
- ".... Ivor Catt, an innovative thinker whose own immense ability in electronics has all too often been too far ahead of conventional ideas to be appreciated: significantly, Catt is beginning to get some high-level backing from companies who see the possibility of major breakthroughs from his work ('Wafers herald new era in computing', New Scientist, 25 February 1989)." – New Scientist, 25nov89, p75.
