= Wisconsin Integrally Synchronized Computer =

Computer at the University of Wisconsin in the 1950s

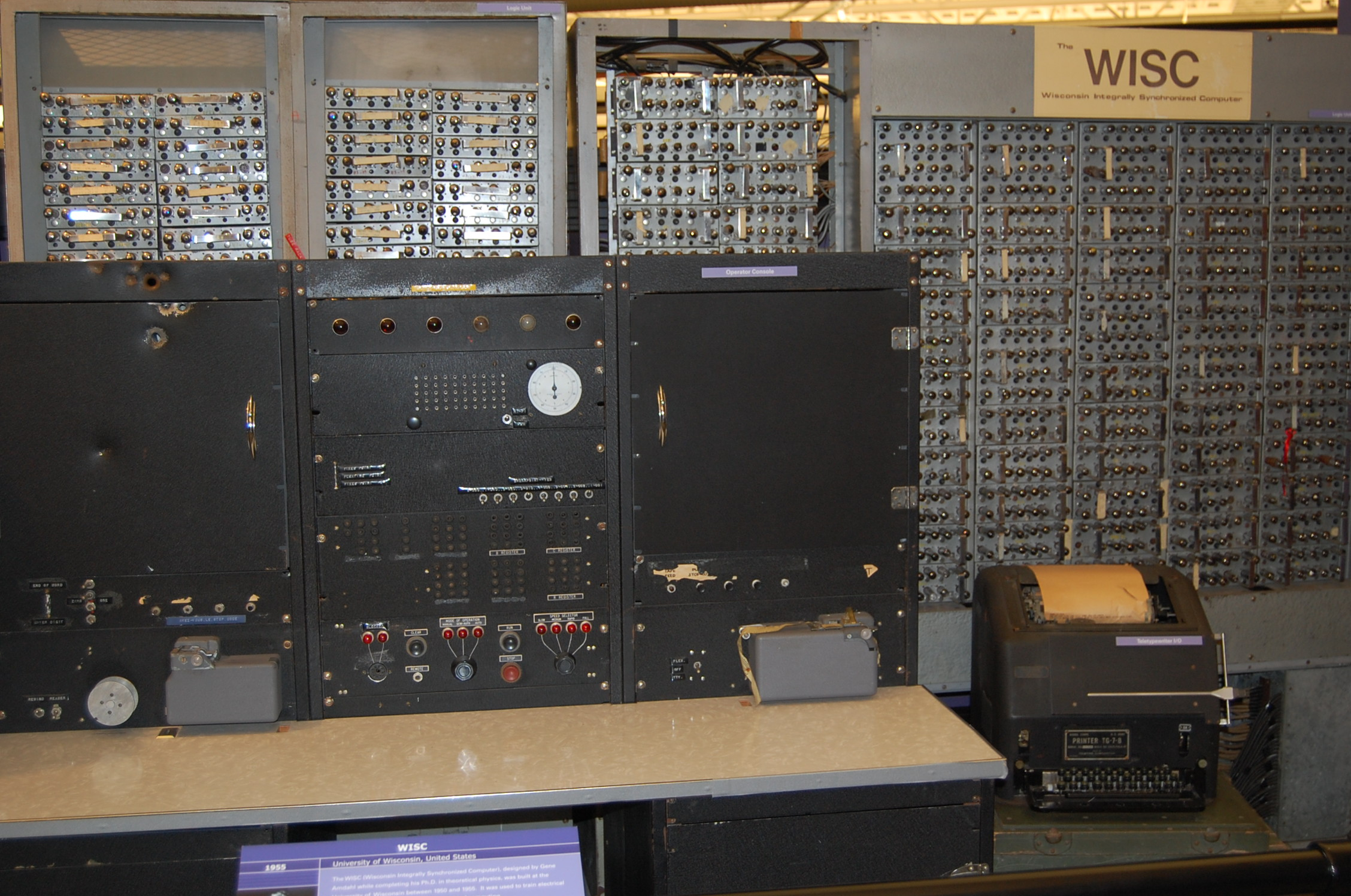

The Wisconsin Integrally Synchronized Computer (WISC) was an early digital computer designed and built at the University of Wisconsin–Madison. Operational in 1954, it was the first digital computer in the state.

Pioneering computer designer Gene Amdahl drafted the WISC's design as his PhD thesis. The computer was built over the period 1951-1954. It had 1,024 50-bit words (equivalent to about 6 KB) of drum memory, with an operation time of 1/15 second and throughput of 60 operations per second, which was achieved by an early form of instruction pipeline. It was capable of both fixed-point and floating-point operations. It weighed about 1 short ton (910 kg).

The WISC is part of the permanent collection of the Computer History Museum.
