= NMOS =

NMOS or nMOS may refer to:

- NMOS logic
- n-channel MOSFET
- Networked Media Open Specifications (NMOS), an industry standard from the Advanced Media Workflow Association for managing media streams
- Necessary military occupational specialty, see United States military occupation code
