= Nixdorf =

Nixdorf may refer to:

== Companies ==
- Nixdorf Computer AG (1968-1990), a former computer company based in Paderborn, Germany
- Siemens Nixdorf Informationssysteme (1990-1999), a company formed when Siemens purchased Nixdorf Computer AG
- Wincor Nixdorf (1999-2016), a German corporation, which succeeded Siemens Nixdorf Informationssysteme, that provides retail and retail banking hardware, software and services
- Diebold Nixdorf (since 2016), the company after Diebold, Inc.'s acquisition of Wincor Nixdorf.

== People ==
- Heinz Nixdorf, a German businessman and founder of Nixdorf Computer AG.

== Places ==
- Nixdorf, the German name for Mikulášovice, a town in the Czech Republic
