= Amdahl Corporation =

American mainframe computer manufacturer

- Genre: Information technology
- Founded: October 19, 1970; 56 years ago
- Founder: Gene Amdahl
- Defunct: September 19, 1997
- Fate: Acquired by Fujitsu and transformed into wholly owned subsidiary
- Headquarters: Sunnyvale, California, U.S.
- Products: Mainframe computers, servers, software
- Services: Educational and consulting services
- Parent: Fujitsu (since 1997)

Amdahl Corporation was an information technology company which specialized in IBM mainframe-compatible computer products, some of which were regarded as supercomputers competing with those from Cray Research. Founded in 1970 by Gene Amdahl, a former IBM computer engineer best known as chief architect of System/360, it has been a wholly owned subsidiary of Fujitsu since 1997. The company was located in Sunnyvale, California.

From its first machine in 1975, Amdahl's business was to provide mainframe computers that were plug-compatible with contemporary IBM mainframes, but offering higher reliability, greater efficiency and lower cost. They often had additional practical advantages in terms of size, power requirements, and being air-cooled rather than requiring a chilled water supply. This offered a price/performance ratio superior to the IBM lineup. The company won about 8% of the mainframe business worldwide, but was a market leader in some regions, most notably in the Carolinas. Proverbially, savvy IBM customers liked to have Amdahl coffee mugs visible in their offices when IBM salespeople came to visit.

As the mainframe market began to change in the later 1980s, Amdahl was increasingly diversified, becoming a major supplier of UNIX and open systems software and servers, data storage subsystems, data communications products, application development software, and a variety of educational and consulting services.

== Company history ==
=== ACS ===
From 1965, Gene Amdahl had been working at IBM on the IBM Advanced Computer Systems project (ACS), which intended to introduce what would be the world's fastest computer. During a shake-up of the project in early 1968, Amdahl suggested that the company abandon the ACS-1 concept and instead use the techniques and circuit designs to build a System/360 compatible design. In a "shoot out" between the two concepts that spring, Amdahl's concept won. Many of the managers of the ACS left, and Amdahl was placed in charge of developing the new concept.

In July 1969, IBM sent out a memo stating that their older software was going to be released into the public domain and that new software would be sold as separate line items, not part of the purchase of a system. This was mostly due to ongoing antitrust investigations launched by 3rd party software companies like Applied Data Research, who complained that IBMs policy of giving away software was hurting the entire market. With the software now a separate product, Amdahl saw the possibility of IBM-compatible machines; if the software was sold separately, then IBM could not refuse to sell it to other computers or they would violate those same anti-trust rules.

In May 1969, Amdahl outlined a series of three machines developed from the ACS concept. This followed IBM's pricing model of offering a series of designs that were separated by about three times in performance and two times in cost, offering customers a reason to upgrade to a larger system. To make the top-end system affordable, it would have to be priced in a way that would push the prices of the smaller systems below what their current machines sold for. Management decided against the plans, and as this essentially ended the ACS effort, Amdahl suggested they shut down the lab. They did so, and Amdahl left the company shortly thereafter in early 1970, telling them of his plans to introduce compatible machines.

=== Foundation ===
Meeting with several other former ACS engineers, a new concept emerged. Instead of attempting to make the fastest computer using the most tightly packed circuit boards possible with current technology, they would instead design a much looser arrangement of five by five components on a standardized card. Although a machine using these cards would not be able to run as fast as ACS, they would be much easier to design and cheaper to build. A key concept in the system was the automated layout of the circuit board interconnections using software running on IBM 1130 computers. (Note: Misquoted in the reference as the 1103.) Looking for partners to produce the circuits, they found Motorola was interested in doing so as long as Amdahl would provide the routing software to them first. Amdahl concluded they would take the software and not deliver the chips. After talking to National Semiconductor and Texas Instruments with no result, they finally signed with Advanced Memory Systems.

The company found it extremely difficult to arrange funding for development. Much of this was due to the venture capital industry's feeling that attempting to compete with IBM was doomed; RCA had spent billions developing and marketing their Spectra 70 series and had yet to come close to a profit, while Xerox had attempted a different attack by buying Scientific Data Systems and was suffering as a result. The effort was saved by Amdahl's relationship with Fujitsu, which allowed him to arrange a meeting with their high-ranking engineers. After three days of intensive meetings, their lead engineer had enough and said they were going to invest $5 million. This news prompted a surprise investment of the same amount from Nixdorf. Worried this would dilute their influence, Fujitsu then invested another 5 million. The company was officially launched in 1971.

=== 470 series ===
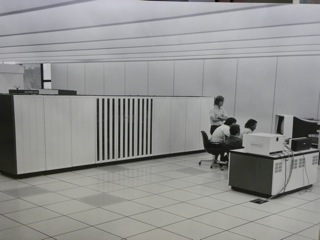
Amdahl 470V/6 at the University of Michigan

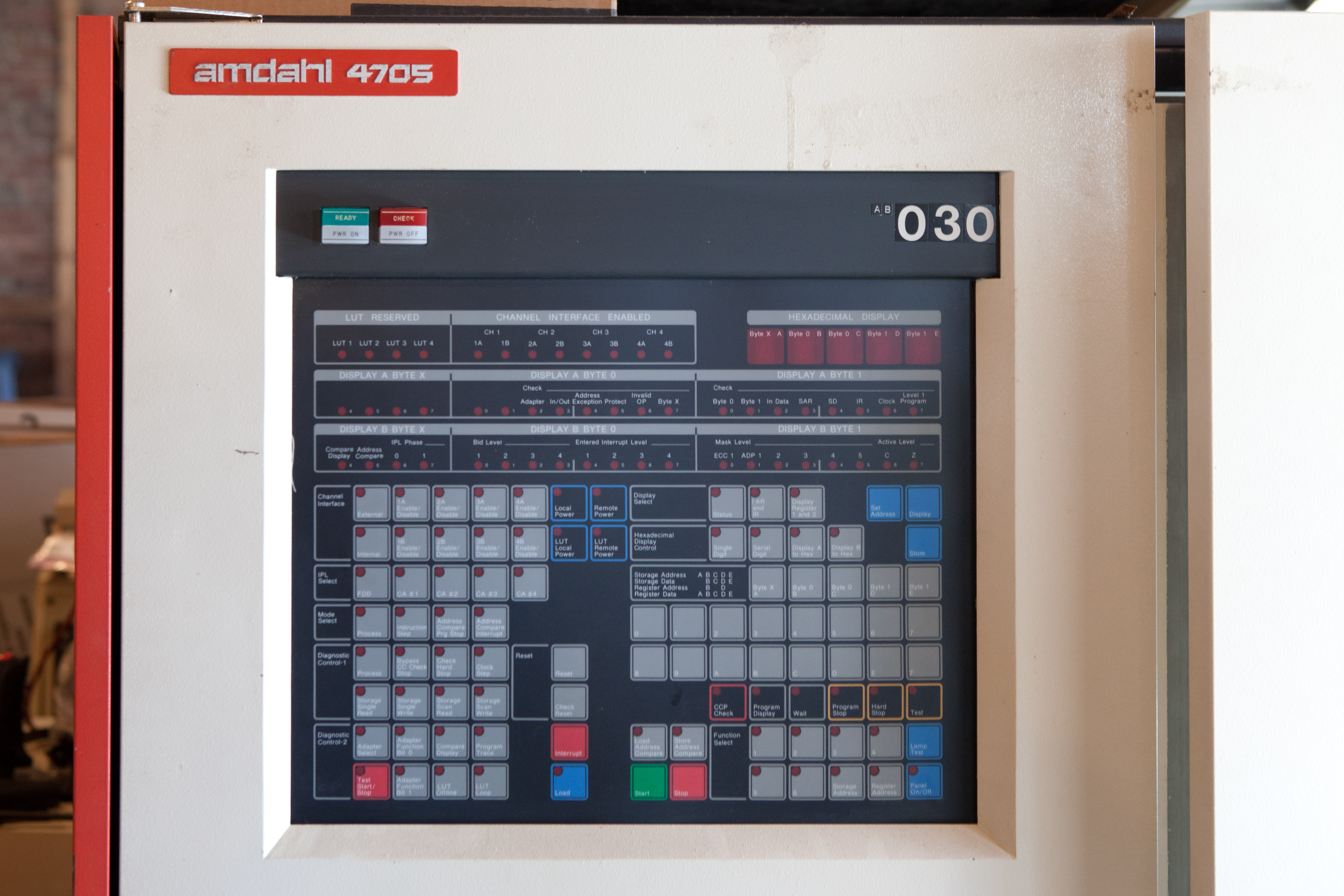
Front panel of an Amdahl 4705 communications controller

During this period, IBM announced their new System/370 series. These were, initially at least, System/360s with new electronics that allowed them to run faster and be less expensive in comparison to the 360s they replaced. Amdahl's new target was to offer a lower-cost version of the high-end member of the 370 family. Amdahl felt that this would trap IBM in their own pricing structure; if they lowered the cost of their high-end machine to compete, to keep their pricing structure they would be forced to lower the cost of their lower-end offerings where they made much of their profit. The new machines were given the name 470/6.

Amdahl engineers, working with Fujitsu circuit designers, developed unique, air-cooled chips which were based on high-speed emitter-coupled logic (ECL) circuit macros. These chips were packaged in a chip package with a heat-dissipating cooling attachment consisting of a cylindrical arrangement of fins, similar to the heat-dissipating fins on a motorcycle engine, mounted directly on the top of the chip. This patented technology allowed the Amdahl mainframes of this era to be completely air-cooled, unlike IBM systems that required chilled water and its supporting infrastructure.

Originally designed for a five-by-five arrangement of components on a card, during development this evolved into a six-by-seven array on multi-layer cards (up to 14 layers), which were then mounted in vertical columns in the computer chassis. The cards had eight connectors attached to micro-coaxial cables that interconnected the system components. A conventional backplane was not used in the central processing units. The card columns held at least three cards per side (two per column in rare exceptions, such as the processor's "C-Unit"). Each column had two large "Tarzan" fans (a "pusher" and a "puller") to move the considerable amount of air needed to cool the chips. Each system included a Data General Nova 1200 programmed to support the CRT console and to accept the same channel command operations as the IBM 3066 on the 370/165 and 370/168.

When it was first introduced, the 370 lacked virtual memory, and this was heavily criticized in the computer press. In 1972, IBM announced a new series of 370 systems that would include this feature, which they referred to as "dynamic address translation". While still being designed, Amdahl modified their design to match, becoming the 470V/6, (Note: Although the formal nomenclature for the series was 470V/number, authors frequently invented other nomenclature.) for "virtual". The machine began to take form in 1974 after several manufacturing issues were resolved. The machine was about twice as fast as the contemporary 370/168 at about the same price. It also occupied one-third as much floor space, and as it lacked the water cooling system, it was much easier to install and maintain.

The first 470V/6 machine, serial number 00001, was delivered to NASA Goddard Space Flight Center in June 1975. It was installed and commissioned in five days, compared to the two or three weeks required for similar IBM machines. The second was delivered to the University of Michigan. Texas A&M received theirs in October and Computer Usage Company in November. By August 1977, 55 systems had been installed and the production line had to be expanded from four to six machines a month.

For the next quarter-century, Amdahl and IBM competed aggressively against one another in the high-end mainframe market. At its peak, Amdahl had a 24% market share. Amdahl owed some of its success to antitrust settlements between IBM and the U.S. Department of Justice, which ensured that Amdahl's customers could license IBM's mainframe software under reasonable terms. The machines could also use any 360 or 370 peripheral, and while IBM initially refused to maintain these machines when connected to Amdahl systems, they were eventually forced to when Amdahl began making a profit maintaining IBM hardware.

=== Later 470s ===
In February 1977, Amdahl announced the 470V/6-II, which offered 5 to 15 percent greater performance but at a slightly higher cost. The next month they announced the 470V/5, a smaller system based on the same circuitry that offered about 60 to 70 percent of the performance of the 6-II. Customers could upgrade from the /5 to the /6-II at any time for $780,000. Deliveries began in September 1977. At the same March announcement, they also introduced the 470V/7 as competition to the recently announced IBM 3033 system, a re-implementation of the 370 series using newer circuitry and incorporating some ideas from the ACS project. The first /7's shipped in August 1978.

The 470V/8, first shipped in 1980, incorporated high-speed 64 KB cache memories to improve performance, and the first real hardware-based virtualization (known as the "Multiple Domain Facility").

Amdahl also pioneered a variable-speed feature - the '470 accelerator' - on the /5 and /7 systems that allowed the customer to run the CPUs at the higher level of performance of the /6 and /8 systems, respectively, when desired. The customer was charged by the number of hours used. Some at Amdahl thought this feature would anger customers, but it became quite popular as customer management could now control expenses while still having greater performance available when necessary.

=== 580 series ===
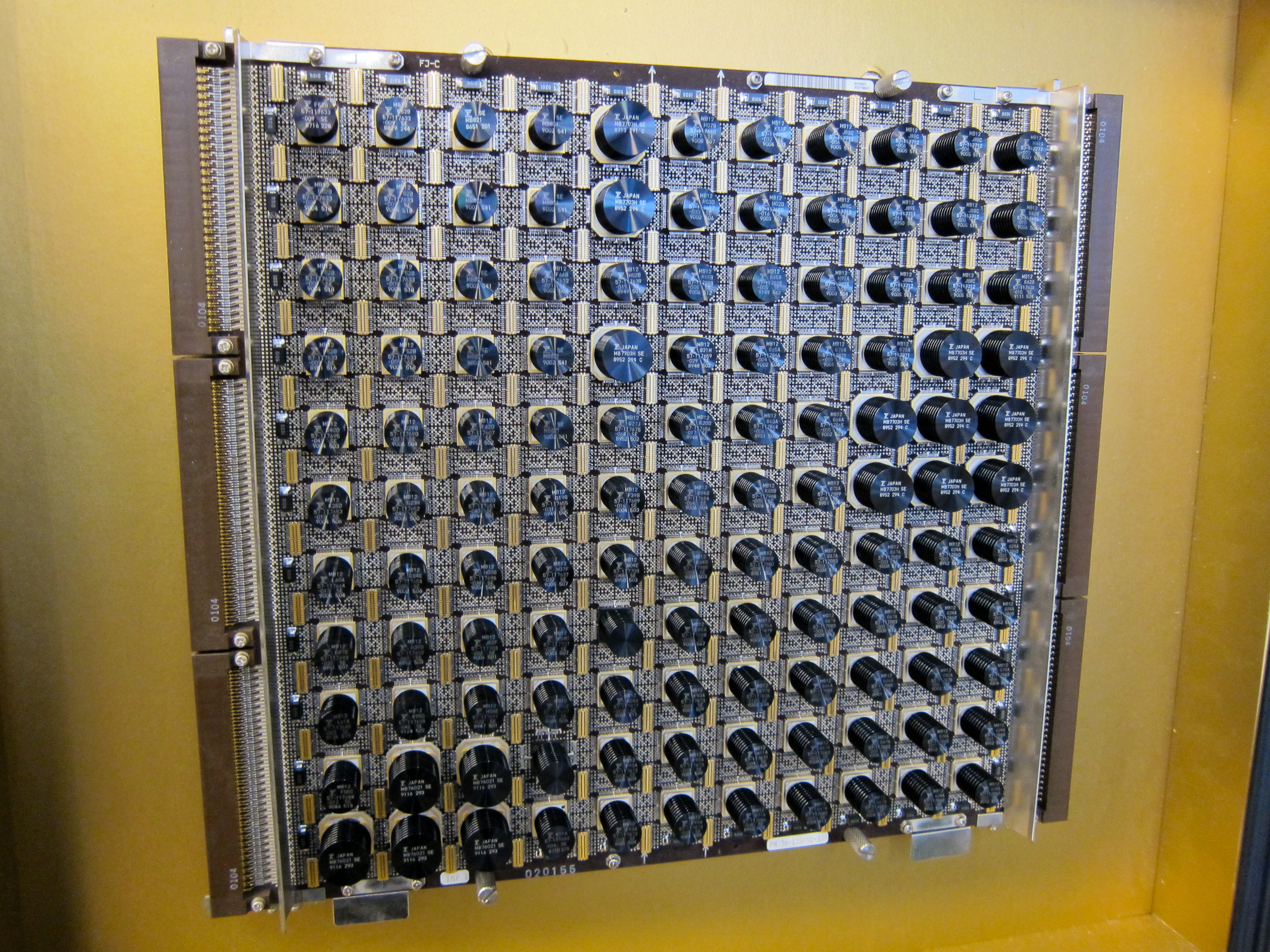
Amdahl 580: 11-by-11 Multi-Chip Carrier board

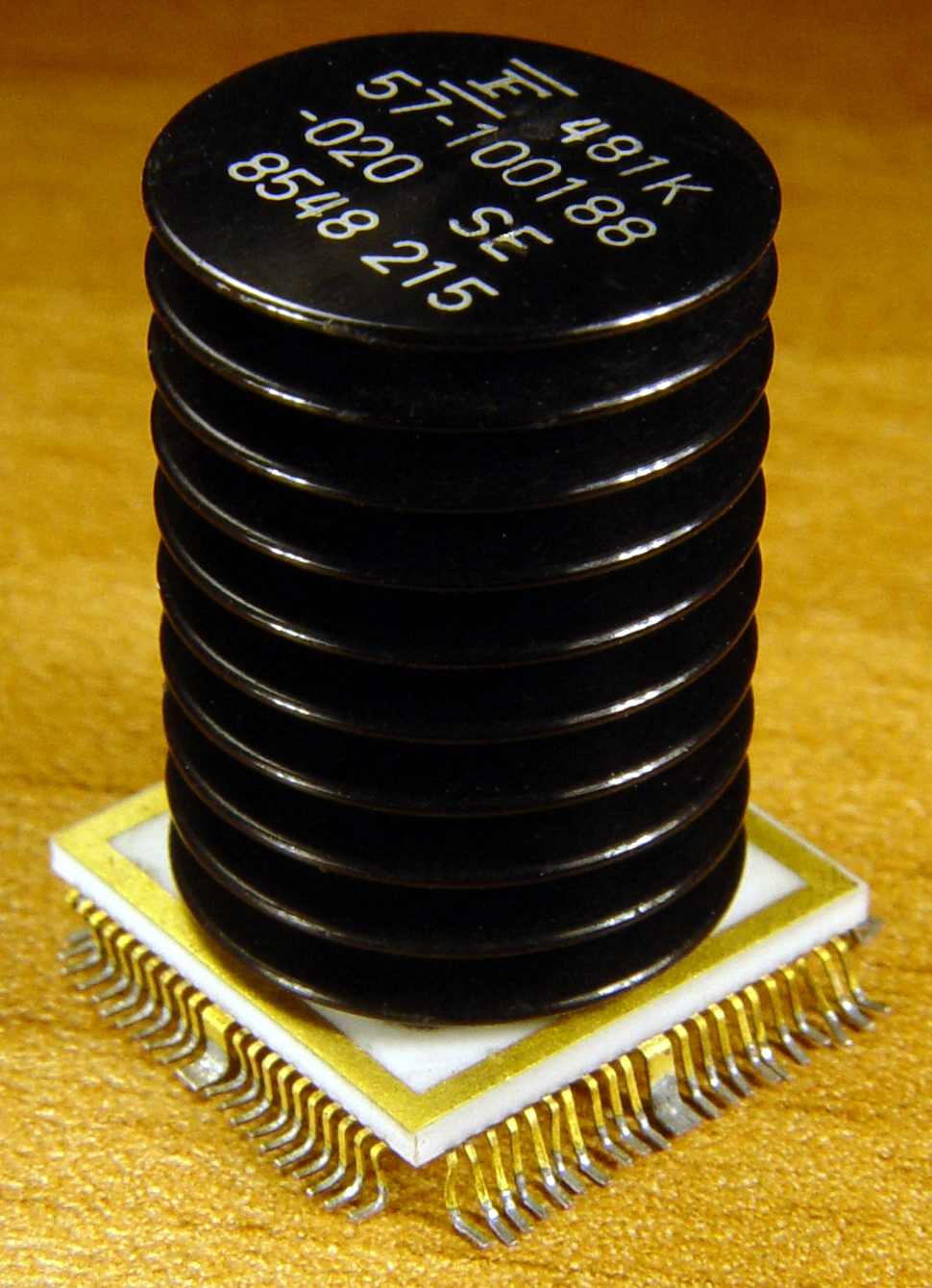
Amdahl 5860: close-up of an Air Cooled Logic Processor with its heat sink

In the late 1970s, Amdahl began an effort to develop a next-generation systems architecture under the 580 project. As the original 470 project had taken two years longer than originally intended, and the engineers in the company felt that they could no longer afford to allow this to happen as the 470 would be rather outdated in another five years. Gene Amdahl felt only a major leap would be worthwhile, and criticized the more conservative approach being suggested. Fujitsu's management sided with the other engineers. Things came to a head in 1979, and Amdahl left the company in August to start Trilogy Systems.

The resulting design was essentially a product-improved version of the 470. It moved from the five-by-six layout of the original circuit boards to a larger eleven-by-eleven layout, and increased the density of the IC's from about 100 transistors per chip to 400 or more. The Multi-Chip Carriers (MCCs) were positioned in high-airflow for cooling. The MCCs were mounted horizontally in a large rectangular frame. The MCCs slid into a complex physical connection system. The processor "side panels" interconnected the system, providing clock propagation delays that maintained race-free synchronous operation at relatively high clock frequencies (15–18 ns base clock cycles). This processor box was cooled by high-speed fans generating horizontal airflow across the MCCs. Three models were introduced, the single-processor 5860, the two-processor 5870, and the two-processor 5880. The 5870 ran as two separate machines in a box, whereas the 5880 had shared memory and could run as a single faster system.

Along the way, the company came to believe that its best bet at competing with IBM head-to-head was to "bulk up", in particular, executing a merger with a well-known vendor in the enterprise storage space. Most Amdahl mainframe customers would purchase storage devices (hard disk and tape drives) from IBM or its plug-compatible competitors. Amdahl first attempted a merger with one of the largest of these vendors, Memorex, in 1979. After this deal fell through, Amdahl went much further on a deal to merge with Colorado-based Storage Technology Corporation (STC). The deal was approved by the boards of both companies, and detailed plans were in place to implement the merger, when Fujitsu, an important partner and major shareholder of Amdahl at the time, objected to the deal which forced it to collapse. STC later tried to develop its own mainframe computer, the failure of which contributed to it filing for Chapter 11 bankruptcy in 1984. Around that same time, Amdahl agreed to allow Fujitsu to acquire just under half of Amdahl, leading to its ultimate acquisition of all of Amdahl's shares some years later.

In the 1980s, Amdahl entered the IBM-compatible peripherals business in front-end processors and storage products, shipping its first 4705 communications controller in August 1980 and its first 6000 DASD in August 1982. These products were very successful for a number of years with the support of Jack Lewis, the former CEO of Amdahl. The reliance upon a limited product line, restricted to containment within the complex business of mainframes and their highly valuable peripherals, constrained the company's hardware business when market forces shifted to x86-based processors. This had been foreseen, leading to an increasing emphasis on software and consulting services.

=== Market exit ===
Post-acquisition logo

In 1987 Amdahl announced that it ended Aspen, a project started seven years earlier to create a proprietary operating system, and instead would focus on Amdahl UTS, its Unix operating system.

By the early 1990s, Amdahl was suffering losses of several hundred million dollars per quarter as a result of declining mainframe sales. Management decided to lay off 900 employees in 1992, 1,100 in early 1993, and another 1,800 (out of the 7,400 remaining) later in that year, as well as canceling hardware development projects in favor of reselling computers from Sun Microsystems.

Amdahl perhaps enjoyed its best success during IBM's transition from bipolar to CMOS technology in the early to mid-1990s. The first generations of IBM's CMOS mainframe processors, the IBM 9672 G3 and G4, could not perform as well as those from the Enterprise System/9000 family, which were based on bipolar technology, giving Amdahl a temporary advantage. However, IBM's CMOS strategy paid off in the long run, allowing IBM's Poughkeepsie factory to produce even faster mainframes at a lower cost as the technology matured. By the time IBM introduced its 64-bit zSeries 900 in 2000, Amdahl's hardware business could no longer compete with IBM with its Millennium and OmniFlex servers that only had 31-bit-addressing. In late 2000, Fujitsu/Amdahl announced that the company had no plans to invest the estimated US$1 billion (or more) to create an IBM-compatible 64-bit system.

Amdahl also failed in its effort to introduce its ObjectStar software (initially known as Huron) during this period and the product later became the object of a successful management buyout. ObjectStar was subsequently acquired by the integration software vendor TIBCO in 2005.

== Amdahl customer options ==
z/OS 1.5 is the last release of IBM's flagship operating system still able to run on 31-bit mainframes, including Amdahl and older IBM systems. IBM effectively ended support for z/OS 1.5 on March 29, 2007. In May 2006, IBM announced that the next version of z/VSE, Version 4, would require a 64-bit system, signaling the end to 31-bit support for that operating system. z/TPF, which became available in December 2005, also requires a 64-bit system. The 31-bit Linux distributions will survive as long as the open source community and distributors have an interest. So while there is still some potential life for Amdahl's hardware, the transition to 64-bit systems is essentially complete. Some companies and governments still had Amdahl systems performing useful work into mid-2006, and Fujitsu/Amdahl promised support to those customers with replacement parts and other services through March 31, 2009.

Arguably IBM did not have a suitable replacement model for many Amdahl customers until the May 2004 introduction of the zSeries 890. The previous zSeries 800 also became an attractive replacement for Amdahl machines by late 2005 as that model's typical used price fell below $100,000 and continued to fall. The System z9 BC model, introduced in May 2006, increased IBM's attractiveness yet again, and the BC drove z800 and z890 prices down even more. The late 2008 introduction of the IBM System z10 BC yet again made IBM's equipment more enticing. In fact, Fujitsu/Amdahl now sells used IBM mainframes and offers services to migrate customers to the IBM machines (This migration is straightforward and comparable to upgrading from one IBM model to a newer IBM model). The IBM z13 is the last z Systems server to support running an operating system in ESA/390 architecture mode; z14, and future machines will support only 64-bit operating systems. Other, generally less attractive options include running without support, rewriting applications, or possibly running applications under FLEX-ES. FLEX-ES is a mainframe instruction set emulator that supports ESA/390 and, in some cases, z/Architecture operating systems and software.

The vestiges of Amdahl's ESA/390 emulation project were resurrected under a new name: Platform Solutions Inc. Using capital from Intel, Hewlett-Packard, Microsoft, and other major investors they designed a line of Itanium-based computers and software to emulate z/Architecture machines so that they could run zSeries operating systems, with zSeries channels for attaching real IBM equipment as well as virtual simulators for most hardware to minimize the need for IBM's peripheral equipment. Its LPARs hosted not only IBM operating systems but 64-bit Intel Itanium Linux, HP-UX, Solaris, and potentially other operating systems.

Platform Solutions started shipping its machines in the first quarter of 2007. This action precipitated a lawsuit from IBM, citing patent infringement and PSI's failure to negotiate a z/Architecture license, and IBM refused to license its operating systems and software on PSI's machines. Platform Solutions countered that by "tying" the sale of its software to the sale of its hardware, IBM was in violation of its prior anti-trust agreement with the U.S. Justice Dept. In July 2008, IBM acquired PSI, and both companies dropped their lawsuits against each other. PSI's machines are no longer available.

== Fujitsu GS21 ==
Fujitsu continues to sell its "GlobalServer" (GS21) mainframe models in the Japanese domestic market. The GS21 machines are essentially ESA/390 (31-bit) instruction set processors largely based on Amdahl-designed technologies but are only compatible with Fujitsu's domestic market operating systems: OSIV/MSP-EX and OSIV/XSP. MSP is most similar to classic IBM MVS/ESA, and XSP is most similar to classic IBM VSE/ESA. Fujitsu GS21 mainframe hardware would most closely correspond to the late 1990s IBM G5 or G6 mainframes in terms of their instruction set support. Fujitsu has stated the company has no intention to license or implement z/Architecture (64-bit).

Fujitsu will discontinue their GS21 mainframe with end-of-sale in 2030, and end-of-support in 2035 "to promote customer modernization".

== See also ==
- Amdahl UTS
- IBM ESA/390
- Magnuson Computer Systems
- Trilogy Systems

== Sources ==
- Aspray, Bill (24 September 2000). "Gene Amdahl Oral History" (PDF) (Interview).
