= Trilogy Systems =

- Traded as: Nasdaq: TRILF
- Founded: 1980; 46 years ago
- Defunct: 1985
- Successor: merged into Elxsi
- Headquarters: Cupertino, California, United States
- Key people: Gene Amdahl, Carl Amdahl, Clifford Madden

Trilogy Systems Corporation was a computer systems company started in 1980. Originally called ACSYS, the company was founded by Gene Amdahl, his son Carl Amdahl and Clifford Madden. Flush with the success of his previous company, Amdahl Corporation, Gene Amdahl was able to raise $230 million for his new venture. Trilogy was the most well-funded start-up company up to that point in Silicon Valley history. It had corporate support from Groupe Bull, Digital Equipment Corporation, Unisys, Sperry Rand and others. The plan was to use extremely advanced semiconductor manufacturing techniques to build an IBM compatible mainframe computer that was both cheaper and more powerful than existing systems from IBM and Amdahl Corporation.

== Amdahl leaves Amdahl ==
Large computers of the 1960s and 70s were physically constructed using small circuit boards populated with individual transistors or small scale integrated circuits. Using many separate boards allowed them to remove malfunctioning circuits and replace them.

At Amdahl Corporation, Amdahl was able to produce systems compatible with the IBM System/370 at lower cost while also running faster. Much of this was due to his collaboration with Fujitsu, who used their own semiconductor fabrication lines to produce the emitter-coupled logic (ECL) transistors in chip form at scales that had not been accomplished before. Previous systems, like the System/370, managed up to 35 gates on a chip, using Amdahl's design, Fujitsu was able to reliably produce 100 gates on a chip. This made the resulting system smaller and cheaper and able to run at faster clock speeds.

In the late 1970s, Amdahl began the process of designing the replacement for their 470 series. The new machine, the 580, had 50 chips on a board and 77 boards in total. There was an inherent drawback in this design; by placing more components on a card they were increasing the chances that a given card would fail, so there was pressure to use more, simpler boards. However, doing so increased the number of boards, to the point where inter-board delays made timing constraints very difficult to achieve. Fujitsu decided to move ahead with the concept even though Amdahl himself was increasingly against the design.

== Trilogy forms ==
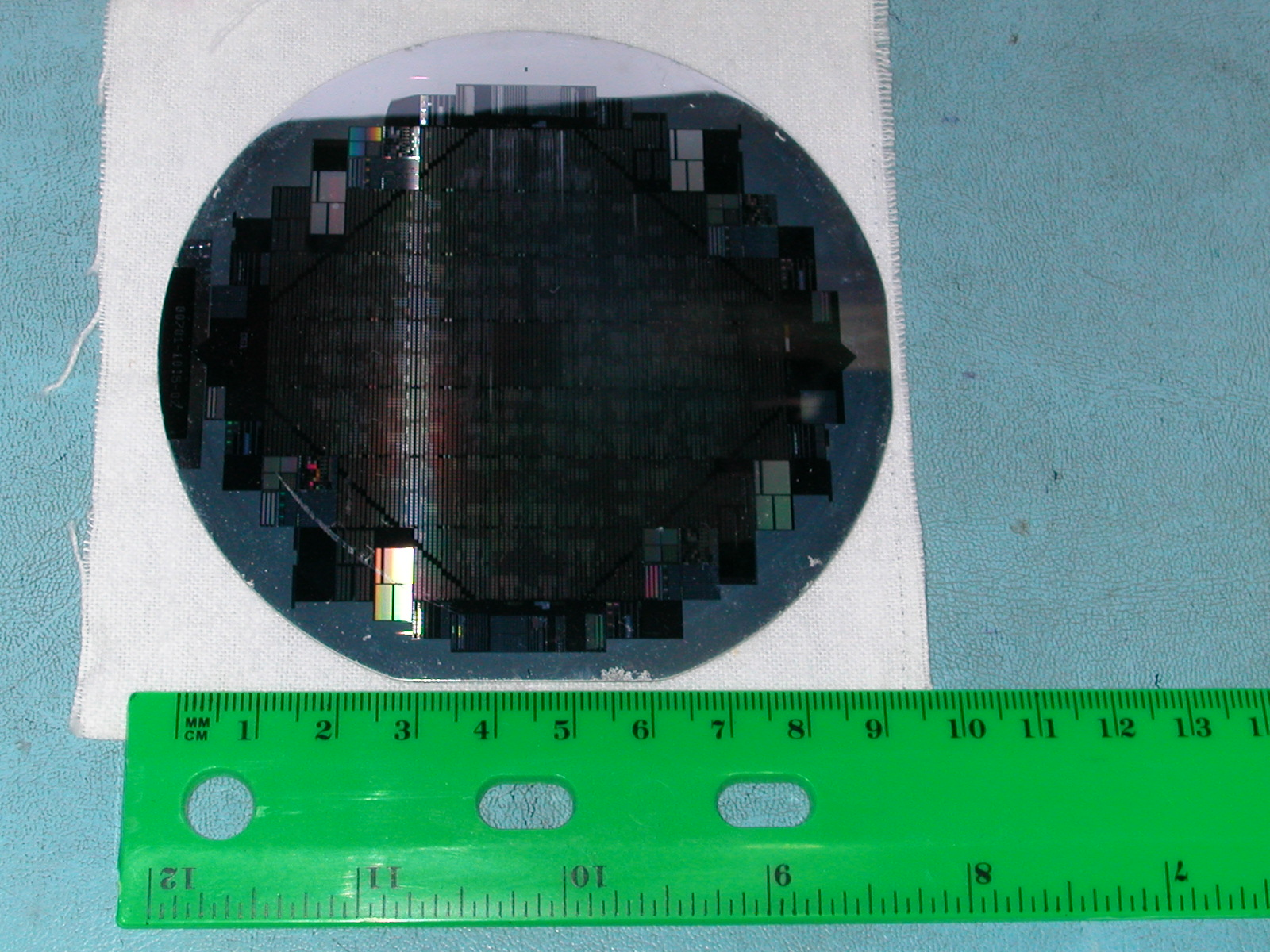
An early wafer-scale integration attempt by Trilogy Systems

In 1980, Amdahl determined he had lost control of the company and decided to leave. Still interested in the compatible mainframe market, he formed Trilogy in 1980. His idea was to solve the complexity problem by producing all of the circuit boards on a single wafer, known as wafer scale integration (WSI). Instead of making many small boards and wiring them together inside the computer, they would all be printed on a single wafer which would carry the connections patterned using the same process. The design called for a computer chip that was 2.5 inch on one side. At the time, computer chips of only 0.25 inch on a side could be reliably manufactured.

The downside to this approach was that if any one of the "circuit boards" was non-functional, the entire wafer would have to be discarded. The chance this would happen would approach 100% at the complexity levels involved. As with other WSI projects, Trilogy's chip design relied on redundancy, that is replication of functional units. If one unit was not fabricated properly, it would be switched out through on-chip wiring and another correctly functioning copy would be used. All critical gates would be produced in triplicate, and, after fabricating, the system would be tested to determine which were working using a "voting" system: if any circuit disagreed with its two partners, it would be considered broken. That circuit would then be disconnected using a laser.

The large chip size demanded larger minimum dimensions for the transistors (due to photolithography manufacturing tolerances over the large chip) than standard-size chips. Consequently, logic density and performance were less than had been forecast.

Alongside the advances in chip manufacturing, advanced chip packaging techniques were also pursued by the company. These included vertical stacking of computer chips and chip-to-chip interconnect technology that used copper conductors and polyimide insulation that allowed for extremely dense packing of signal wiring. Though overall system power consumption would be lower, the power dissipation would be much more concentrated at the single large chip. This required new cooling techniques such as sealed heat exchangers to be developed.

The company was beset by problems on multiple fronts. Gene Amdahl was involved in a car accident and preoccupied with the ensuing lawsuit, while Madden, the company's president, died from a brain tumor. Compounding these setbacks, their semiconductor fabrication plant was damaged during construction by a winter storm, and the redundancy schemes used in the chip design proved insufficient to give reasonable manufacturing yields. The chip interconnect technology presented further manufacturing difficulties: the layers tended to delaminate, and there was no automated way to repair soldering errors.

In 1983, the company had an initial public offering and raised $60 million. By this time manufacturing was improving and it was common to get three or four "quadrants" that ran property. But by this time it was apparent that VLSI design would deliver chips with similar performance within a year or two, and that now, after about six years of effort, there was little reason to continue development.

== Changing focus ==
By mid-1984, the company decided it was too difficult to manufacture their computer design. Gene Amdahl stepped down as CEO and Henry Montgomery was brought in as replacement.

The new leadership redirected the company to be a technology provider to other computer companies. The only major customer was Digital Equipment, which paid $10 million for the rights to the interconnect and cooling technologies. These were used for its VAX 9000 mainframe computers. Years later, the manufacturing difficulties of the copper/polyimide technology restricted DEC's ability to ship its mainframes.

At the end of 1985, Gene Amdahl, as company chairman, decided to stop all Trilogy development and use the remaining $70 million of the raised capital to buy Elxsi, a minicomputer start-up company. In 1989, Gene Amdahl left the merged company.

Trilogy Systems was known as one of the largest financial failures in Silicon Valley before the burst of Internet/dotcom bubble in 2001. In describing the company, financial columnists coined the term "crater" as describing companies that consumed huge amounts of venture capital and later imploded to leave nothing for their investors.
