= Cerebras Systems =

American semiconductor company

Cerebras Systems Inc.

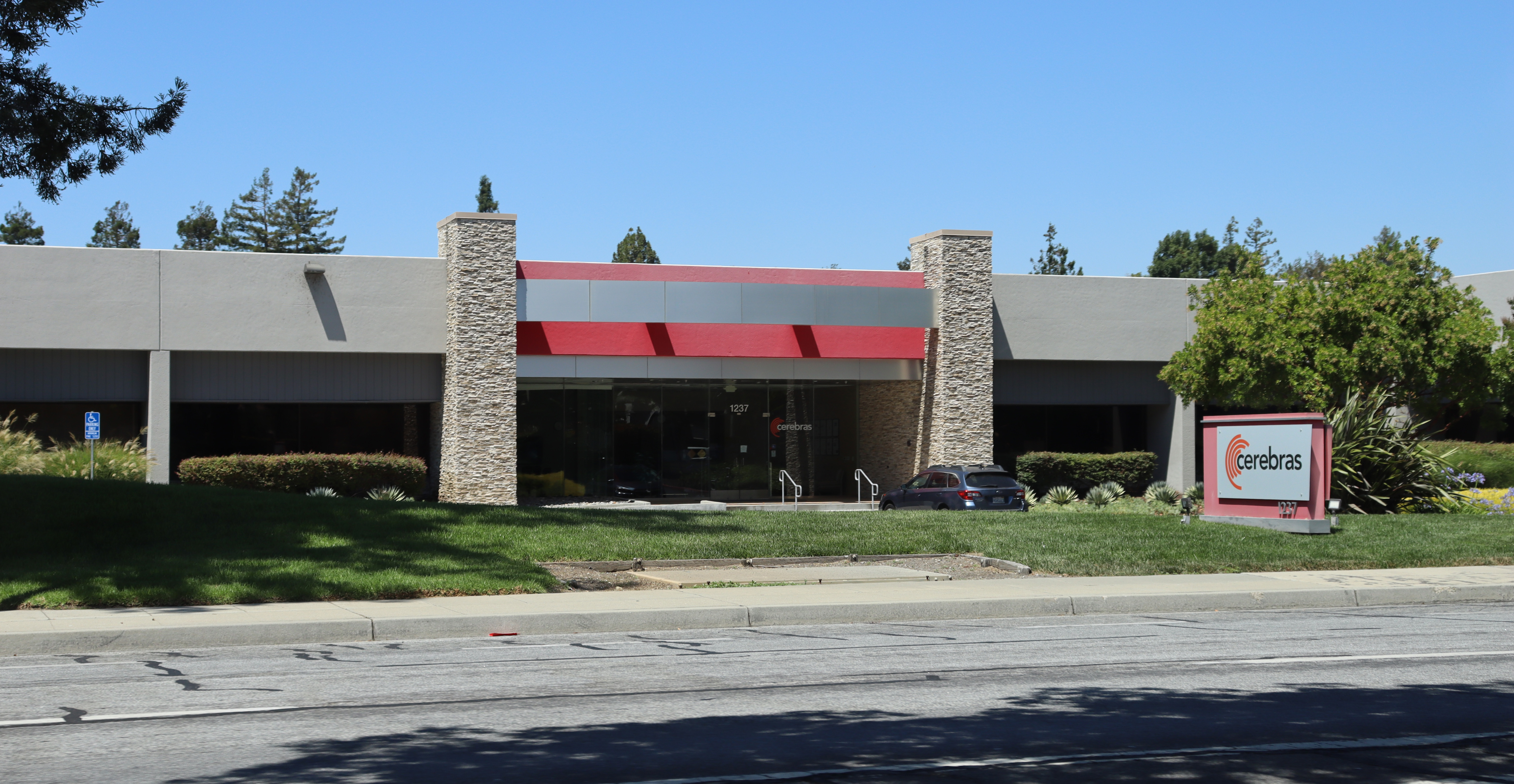
- Headquarters in Sunnyvale
- Type: Public
- Traded as: Nasdaq: CBRS
- Industry: Semiconductors; Artificial intelligence
- Founded: 2015; 11 years ago
- Founders: Andrew Feldman; Gary Lauterbach; Michael James; Sean Lie; Jean-Philippe Fricker
- Headquarters: Sunnyvale, California, US
- Key people: Andrew Feldman (CEO); Robert Komin (CFO); Sean Lie (CTO); Dhiraj Mallick (COO)
- Products: Semiconductors; Supercomputers; APIs; Data centers
- Revenue: ▲$510 million (2025)
- Net income: ▲$87 million (2025)
- Total assets: ▲$2.326 billion (2025)
- Total equity: ▲ -$578 million (2025)
- Owner: Benchmark (17.6 million shares); Foundation Capital (15.3 million shares); Eclipse Ventures Fund 1 (13.5 million shares); Alpha Wave (12.1 million shares); Andrew D. Feldman (10.1 million shares); Sean Lie (5.3 million shares); G42 (3.5 million shares); Dhiraj Mallick (1.8 million shares); OpenAI (warrants to purchase 33.4 million shares, subject to purchases of compute capacity by OpenAI)
- Number of employees: 708 (2025)
- Website: cerebras.ai

Cerebras Systems Inc., headquartered in Sunnyvale, California, develops semiconductors, supercomputers, and related software to power artificial intelligence deep-learning applications such as inference engines. Products include its wafer scale engine (WSE)-3 semiconductors, its CS-3 supercomputers, and its "AI inference cloud" and "AI training cloud" APIs, which allow users to access the company's computing power without buying its hardware. The company also builds data centers using its processors and supercomputers to provide cloud computing services directly to clients.

Measuring 215 mm (8.5 in) squared, the company's WSE-3 semiconductors are currently the largest AI semiconductors ever built. They take up entire silicon wafers and use wafer-scale integration and switched fabric. This reduces latency and interconnect bottlenecks compared to GPU clusters. They use static random-access memory, as opposed to dynamic random-access memory. Cerebras semiconductors and computer systems are much more powerful than those of competitors; however, they have disadvantages due to their large size, 25kW power draw, and cost of as much as $3 million per node.

The company has 4 major customers: the Mohamed bin Zayed University of Artificial Intelligence (62% of 2025 revenues), G42 (24% of 2025 revenues), OpenAI (signed in 2026), and Amazon Web Services (signed in 2026).

Cerebras has offices in Sunnyvale, San Diego, Toronto, and Bangalore, India. Its semiconductors are manufactured by TSMC, currently the only company that has the ability to manufacture Cerebras chips.

The company's primary competitors for its hardware are Nvidia, AMD, Intel, and Broadcom and the company's primary competitors for its cloud computing services are Amazon Web Services, Microsoft Azure, Google Cloud Platform, Oracle Corporation, and CoreWeave.

== History ==
Cerebras Systems was founded in 2015 by Andrew Feldman, Gary Lauterbach, Michael James, Sean Lie, and Jean-Philippe Fricker. These five founders worked together at SeaMicro, which was started in 2007 by Feldman and Lauterbach and sold to AMD in 2012 for $334 million.

The founders knew that GPUs were not the optimal semiconductors for high-level processes. However, they had to design unique cooling methods to prevent a "massive" semiconductor from burning when drawing power, unique software to route around usual microscopic manufacturing defects, and they had to invent a machine that could drill 40 screws into the wafer simultaneously without it cracking.

The company had difficulty solving the problem of integrated circuit packaging: adhering the silicon to a motherboard, receiving power, and dealing with heating and cooling and the pipes to deliver and return data. It was burning through $8 million per month and spent $200 million trying to solve the problem. In July 2019, after exhaustive trial and error, the company finally produced a product that worked.

In August 2019, Cerebras announced WSE-1, its first-generation Wafer-Scale Engine (WSE) semiconductors and its CS-1 supercomputing system. The CS-1 is a 19-inch rack-mounted appliance and includes a single WSE primary processor with 400,000 processing cores, 1.2 trillion transistors (twelve 100-gigabit ethernet connections), and 18 gigabytes of memory.

The company's first customers were educational institutions and life-sciences companies that were building supercomputers for purposes of drug discovery, computational fluid dynamics, genetic and genomic research, to predict response to drugs, and for COVID-19 research. Early customers included GlaxoSmithKline, AstraZeneca, the National Energy Technology Laboratory, Lawrence Livermore National Laboratory, the Pittsburgh Supercomputing Center, and Edinburgh Parallel Computing Centre.

In September 2020, the company opened an office in Japan and partnered with Tokyo Electron.

In April 2021, the company released its CS-2 system, based on the company's Wafer Scale Engine Two (WSE-2), which has 850,000 cores. The CS-2 is manufactured by the 7 nm process of TSMC. It is 26 inches (660 mm) tall and fits in one-third of a standard data center rack. The WSE-2 has 850,000 cores and 2.6 trillion transistors. It enables a single system to support AI models with more than 120 trillion parameters. The WSE-2 expanded on-chip SRAM to 40 gigabytes, memory bandwidth to 20 petabytes per second, and total fabric bandwidth to 220 petabits per second. Customers included TotalEnergies, nference, the National Center for Supercomputing Applications (NCSA), and the Leibniz Supercomputing Centre.

In August 2021, Cerebras announced a partnership with Peptilogics on the development of AI for peptide therapeutics.

In June 2022, Cerebras set a record for the largest AI models ever trained on one device—a single CS-2 system with one Cerebras wafer trained models with up to 20 billion parameters. The Cerebras CS-2 system can train multibillion-parameter natural-language-processing (NLP) models including GPT-3XL 1.3 billion models, as well as GPT-J 6B, GPT-3 13B, and GPT-NeoX 20B with reduced software complexity and infrastructure.

In August 2022, the Computer History Museum in Mountain View, California unveiled a new display featuring the WSE-2, named "The Biggest Chip In the World".

Also in August 2022, Cerebras opened an office in Bangalore, India.

In September 2022, Cerebras announced that it can patch its chips together to create what would be the largest-ever computing cluster for AI computing. A Wafer-Scale Cluster can connect up to 192 CS-2 AI systems into a cluster, while a cluster of 16 CS-2 AI systems can create a computing system with 13.6 million cores for natural-language processing. It uses data parallelism to train.

In October 2022, Sandia National Laboratories of the National Nuclear Security Administration began using the CS-2 in nuclear stockpile stewardship computing, to determine if nuclear weapons will work as intended.

In November 2022, Cerebras unveiled the Andromeda supercomputer, which combines 16 WSE-2 chips into one cluster with 13.5 million AI-optimized cores, delivering up to 1 exaflop of AI computing horsepower, or at least one quintillion (10^{18}) operations per second. The entire system consumes 500 kW, which was a drastically lower amount than somewhat-comparable GPU-accelerated supercomputers.

In November 2022, Cerebras announced a partnership with Cirrascale Cloud Services to provide a flat-rate "pay-per-model" compute time for its Cerebras AI Model Studio.

In November 2022, the National Energy Technology Laboratory (NETL) set milestones using Cerebras products.

In November 2022, Argonne National Laboratory won the 2022 Gordon Bell Special Prize for COVID-19 research by using the CS-2 as well as products from Nvidia and Hewlett-Packard to transform large language models to analyze and predict variants of SARS-CoV-2.

In July 2023, G42 agreed to pay around $100 million to purchase the first of potentially nine supercomputers from Cerebras. The first computer, Condor Galaxy 1 (CG-1), is capable of 4 quintillion floating-point operations per second (4 exaflops) of compute and contains 54 million cores. In November 2023, the second computer, the Condor Galaxy 2 (CG-2), was announced, with similar specifications as the CG-1. In March 2024, the companies broke ground on the Condor Galaxy 3 (CG-3), which can reach 8 exaFLOPs of performance and contains 58 million AI-optimized cores.

In August 2023, Cerebras, the Mohamed bin Zayed University of Artificial Intelligence, and G42 subsidiary Inception launched Jais, a large language model.

In March 2024, Cerebras introduced Wafer Scale Engine (WSE-3) architecture, a 5nm-based chip hosting 4 trillion transistors and 900,000 AI-optimized cores, and the basis for the CS-3. It has twice the performance of CS-2. The CS-3 was named to the list of the "best inventions of 2024" by Time.

In May 2024, Cerebras in collaboration with researchers from Sandia National Laboratories, Lawrence Livermore National Laboratory, Los Alamos National Laboratory, and the National Nuclear Security Administration, simulated 800,000 atoms interacting with each other, calculating the interactions in increments of one femtosecond at a time. Each step took just microseconds to compute on the Cerebras WSE-2, much faster than on the Frontier supercomputer.

Cerebras was named to the "100 Most Influential Companies list" by Time in May 2024.

In June 2024, Cerebras announced a collaboration with Dell Technologies, for AI compute infrastructure for generative AI.

In August 2024, Cerebras launched its AI inference service, which it claimed to be ten to twenty times faster than systems built using Nvidia's H100 Hopper graphics processing units.

In January 2025, the Mayo Clinic announced a collaboration with Cerebras to combine genomic data with de-identified data from patient records and medical evidence to explore the ability to predict a patient's response to treatments to manage disease.

In January 2025, Cerebras announced support for DeepSeek's R1 70B reasoning model at 1,600 tokens/second.

In February 2025, Mistral AI began using Cerebras products to power its Le Chat service and reached a speed record.

Also in February 2025, Cerebras announced a partnership with Perplexity AI's Sonar model, which runs on Cerebras chips at 1,200 tokens per second.

In March 2025, Cerebras announced plans to construct six new datacenters in Dallas, Minneapolis, Oklahoma City, Montreal, New York, and France, increasing inference capacity twentyfold to over 40 million tokens per second, expecting increased demand from Llama 4 and DeepSeek. Meta Platforms agreed to use Cerebras products to power the Llama API in April 2025.

In April 2025, Cerebras and Ranovus announced a contract from DARPA.

In May 2025, Cerebras beat NVIDIA's Blackwell in Llama 4 Inference with more than 2,500 tokens per second/user, compared to 1,000 for Blackwell, on the 400B-parameter Llama 4 Maverick model in testing by an independent benchmarking firm.

In July 2025, Cerebras unveiled Qwen3-235B, an ultra-fast deployment of Alibaba Group's open-weight Qwen AI models, with full 131k context support on its inference cloud platform.

In January 2026, Cerebras signed a deal with OpenAI to deliver 750 megawatts of computing power through 2028 for $10 billion. As part of the agreement with OpenAI, the company is temporarily prohibited from selling its products to Anthropic.

In March 2026, Amazon Web Services agreed to purchase CS-3 systems to be used for its Trainium-powered servers set to be deployed on Amazon Bedrock in its data centers.

In August 2026, CS-4 system was introduced.

=== Financing ===
In May 2016, Cerebras raised $27 million in a series A round led by Benchmark, Foundation Capital and Eclipse Ventures.

In December 2016, the company raised a series B round led by Coatue Management. In January 2017, it raised a series C round led by VY Capital.

In November 2018, Cerebras raised $88 million in a series D round, making the company a unicorn. Investors in this round included Altimeter, VY Capital, Coatue, Foundation Capital, Benchmark, and Eclipse.

In November 2019, Cerebras raised $270 million in a series E round at a valuation of $2.4 billion.

In November 2021, Cerebras raised $250 million in a Series F round, valuing the company at over $4 billion and bringing its total financing to $720 million. The Series F financing round was led by Alpha Wave Ventures and Abu Dhabi Growth Fund (ADG).

In July, August, and September 2024, the company raised $85 million in a series F-1 round, selling shares for $14.66 each.

In September 2025, the company raised $1.1 billion in a Series G round, selling shares for $36.23 each, or a valuation of $8.1 billion.

In January 2026, the company raised $1.0 billion in a Series H round, selling shares for $89.01 each. In this round, Benchmark invested $225 million, while Alpha Wave and funds managed by Fidelity Investments each invested $100 million.

On May 14, 2026, the company became a public company via the largest U.S. technology initial public offering since 2019, raising $5.55 billion by selling 30 million shares at $185 each and opening on Nasdaq at $350, valuing the company at $95 billion. CBRS stock surged by 68% on its first day of trading.

== See also ==
- Wafer-scale integration – System of building very large integrated circuit networks
- Wafer-level packaging – Means of packaging an integrated circuit
- Semiconductor device fabrication – Manufacturing process used to create integrated circuits
- Transistor count – Number of transistors in a device
- Comparison of deep learning software – Tabular comparison of deep learning software
- Neural processing unit – Hardware acceleration unit for artificial intelligence tasks
- Outline of deep learning – Overview of and topical guide to deep learning
