= Eric Xing =

American artificial intelligence researcher

Eric Poe Xing
- 邢波
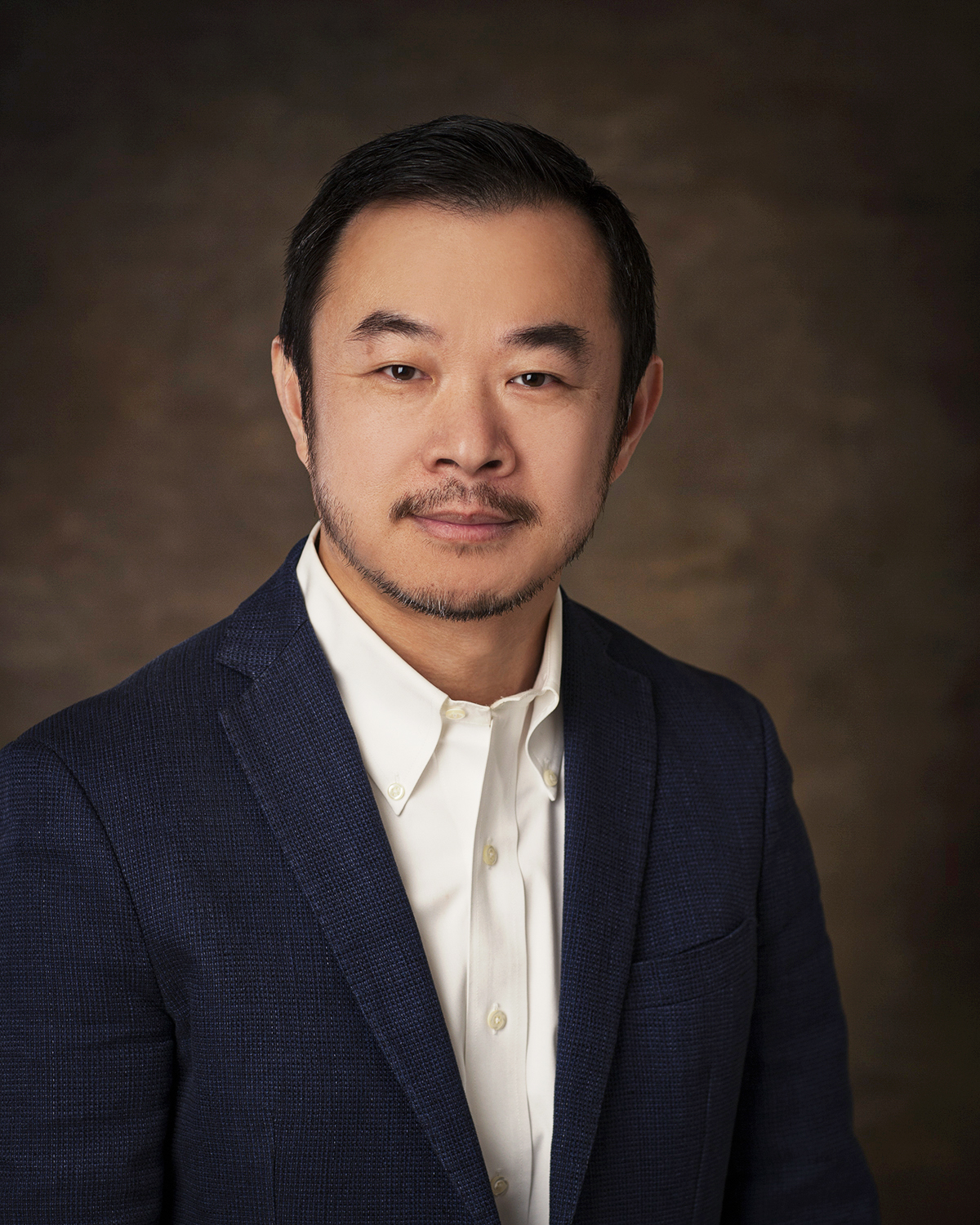
- Born: Shanghai, China
- Education: Tsinghua University; Rutgers University; University of California, Berkeley
- Spouse: Wei Wu
- Scientific career
- Fields: Computer science
- Workplaces: Carnegie Mellon University; Mohamed bin Zayed University of Artificial Intelligence
- Thesis: Probabilistic graphical models and algorithms for genomic analysis (2004)
- Doctoral advisor: Richard Karp; Michael I. Jordan; Stuart J. Russell
- Website: cs.cmu.edu/~epxing/

Eric Poe Xing (Chinese: 邢波) is an American computer scientist who has been serving as president of Mohamed bin Zayed University of Artificial Intelligence (MBZUAI) since January 2021. He is also a professor in the Carnegie Mellon University School of Computer Science where he founded the SAILING Lab in 2004, and is the co-founder of the AI companies Petuum and GenBio AI.

Xing's research focuses on statistical machine learning, probabilistic graphical models, and systems for distributed machine learning. He was elected a Fellow of the Institute of Electrical and Electronics Engineers in 2019 for "contributions to machine learning algorithms and systems" and a Fellow of the Association for Computing Machinery in 2022 for "contributions to algorithms, architectures, and applications in machine learning."

== Education ==
Xing earned a B.Sc. in physics from Tsinghua University in 1993, and an M.Sc. in computer science from Rutgers University in 1998.

He earned a Ph.D. in molecular biology and biochemistry from Rutgers in 1999, supervised by molecular cancer researcher Chung S. Yang. His dissertation examined the inactivation of the Rb and p53 pathways in human esophageal squamous cell carcinoma.

He earned a second Ph.D. in computer science from the University of California, Berkeley in 2004, supervised by Richard Karp, Michael I. Jordan, and Stuart J. Russell. His thesis applied probabilistic graphical models to motif identification and haplotype inference in genomic data.

== Career ==
Xing joined Carnegie Mellon University (CMU) as a faculty member in 2004, where he created the Statistical Artificial Intelligence and Integrative Genomics (SAILING) Lab.

He held visiting appointments from 2010 to 2011, serving as a visiting research professor at Facebook Inc. and as a visiting associate professor in the Department of Statistics at Stanford University.

He served as co-Program Chair of the International Conference on Machine Learning (ICML) in 2014 and General Chair in 2019.

Xing served as the founding director of CMU’s Center for Machine Learning and Health, established in 2015 as part of the Pittsburgh Health Data Alliance, a collaboration between CMU, the University of Pittsburgh, and the University of Pittsburgh Medical Center.

In 2016, Xing co-founded Petuum Inc., a US-based startup. In 2017, Petuum raised $93 million in a round of venture funding from SoftBank. In 2018 Petuum was named a World Economic Forum Technology Pioneer. In 2019, Xing received the Carnegie Science Award for Startup Entrepreneurs in recognition of his leadership of Petuum.

On 29 November 2020, Xing was appointed president of the Mohamed bin Zayed University of Artificial Intelligence (MBZUAI), with the appointment taking effect in January 2021.

In 2024, Xing co-founded GenBio AI where he is chief scientist. The US-based startup, which he co-founded with David Baker, Ziv Bar-Joseph, Emma Lundberg, Le Song and Fred Hu, aims to create AI-driven digital organisms (AIDO) for the purposes of modeling medical treatments.

Xing has overseen the launch of the MBZUAI Institute of Foundation Models (IFM), which focuses on research and development of large-scale foundation models. In 2025–2026, IFM released the open-source reasoning model K2 Think, which was covered internationally as part of the UAE’s push to develop domestically controlled (“sovereign”) AI capabilities. IFM presented PAN as a “world model” research project and demonstrated related systems publicly. MBZUAI also collaborated with G42 and Cerebras Systems on the Jais language model, an open-source Arabic–English large language model released in 2023, according to Reuters.

== Awards and honors ==
Xing is a recipient of the National Science Foundation (NSF) Career Award and the Alfred P. Sloan Research Fellowship.

Xing is an elected Fellow of the following institutes and associations:

- Association for the Advancement of Artificial Intelligence (AAAI) 2016
- Institute of Electrical and Electronics Engineers (IEEE) 2019 for "contributions to machine learning algorithms and systems"
- American Statistical Association (ASA) 2022
- Association for Computing Machinery (ACM) 2022 for "contributions to algorithms, architectures, and applications in machine learning"
- Institute of Mathematical Statistics (IMS) 2023
- International Society for Computational Biology (ISCB) 2026

== Selected publications ==
- Xing, Eric; Jordan, Michael Irwin; Russell, Stuart Jonathan; Ng, Andrew (2003). "Distance Metric Learning with Application to Clustering with Side-Information" (PDF). Advances in Neural Information Processing Systems 15. Advances in Neural Information Processing Systems. Wikidata Q77691192.
- Edoardo M. Airoldi; Blei, David Meir; Fienberg, Stephen; Xing, Eric (2008). "Mixed Membership Stochastic Blockmodels". Journal of Machine Learning Research. 9: 1981–2014. PMC 3119541. PMID 21701698. Wikidata Q35058357.
- Xing, Eric; Jordan, Michael Irwin; Karp, Richard Manning (28 June 2001), Feature selection for high-dimensional genomic microarray data, vol. 18, pp. 601–608, Wikidata Q138678867
- Xing EP; Karp RM (2001). "CLIFF: clustering of high-dimensional microarray data via iterative feature filtering using normalized cuts". Bioinformatics. 17 Suppl 1: S306-15. doi:10.1093/bioinformatics/17.suppl_1.s306. PMID 11473022. Wikidata Q30657299.
