= Andrew Feldman =

Andrew Feldman may refer to:

- Andrew Feldman, Baron Feldman of Elstree (born 1966), British Conservative politician
- Andrew Feldman (businessman), American technology entrepreneur
- Andrew Feldman (poker player) (born 1987), English poker player
- Andrew Barth Feldman (born 2002), American actor
