= Ling Shao =

Chinese computer scientist

- Education: University of Science and Technology of China (B.Eng.); University of Oxford (M.Sc. and Ph.D.)
- Awards: IEEE Fellow (2021); IAPR Fellow (2018)
- Scientific career
- Fields: Computer Vision; Generative AI; Multimodal AI; AI for Healthcare; Physical AI
- Workplaces: Inception Institute of Artificial Intelligence (IIAI); Mohamed bin Zayed University of Artificial Intelligence (MBZUAI)
- Doctoral advisor: Michael Brady

Ling Shao (邵岭) is a British-Chinese scientist and entrepreneur in the field of artificial intelligence, best known for founding the Inception Institute of Artificial Intelligence (IIAI) and the Mohamed bin Zayed University of Artificial Intelligence (MBZUAI), in Abu Dhabi, the United Arab Emirates.

== Education ==
Ling Shao received his B.Eng. degree in Electronic and Information Engineering from the University of Science and Technology of China (USTC) in 2001. He received his M.Sc. and Ph.D. (D.Phil.) degrees from the University of Oxford in 2002 and 2005, respectively.

== Career and Research ==
After completing his Ph.D., Ling Shao worked as a Senior Scientist at Philips Research in Eindhoven, the Netherlands from 2005 to 2009. From 2009 to 2017, he held senior academic positions at several British universities, including Senior Lecturer at the University of Sheffield and Chair Professor at the University of East Anglia. From 2018 to 2021, he served as CEO of Group 42 (G42)'s research company, IIAI, and simultaneously as Executive President and Provost of MBZUAI in Abu Dhabi, UAE. Moreover, he was a founding member (employee #1) and the Chief Scientist of G42. He also worked shortly as a Chief Scientist at JD.com in Beijing, China in 2017, and as CTO and Chief Scientist at Saudi Data and AI Authority (SDAIA) in Riyadh, KSA in 2022. Since April 2022, Ling Shao has served as Chief Scientist and President, and subsequently as Global President and Chief AI Officer of Terminus Group, an international AIoT and smart city solutions and services provider.

Shao's research interests include computer vision, generative AI, multimodal AI, physical AI and AI for healthcare.

== Awards and honors ==
In recognition of his scientific contributions to the UAE, he was awarded the Mohammed bin Rashid Medal for Scientific Distinguishment (the highest scientific honor in the UAE) by His Highness Sheikh Mohammed bin Rashid Al Maktoum, the Prime-Minister and Vice-President of the UAE, and the Ruler of Dubai. Shao has been elected a Fellow of the IEEE, the IAPR, the IET and the British Computer Society.
