= Peng Xiao (businessman) =

Technology executive

- Education: Hawaii Pacific University (BS, BA); George Washington University (MA)
- Occupations: Founder & CEO of G42

Peng Xiao is a global technology executive and the founding Group Chief Executive Officer (CEO) of Abu Dhabi-based artificial intelligence (AI) company G42. He has helped establish the United Arab Emirates (UAE) AI infrastructure, including gigawatt-scale data center initiatives and partnerships with Microsoft, OpenAI, and Nvidia through his work with G42.

== Education ==
Xiao was born in China and later relocated to the United States, where he pursued his higher education. He attended Hawaii Pacific University, where he earned his bachelor's degree in 1994. In 1997, he received his master's degree from George Washington University.

== Career ==
Xiao began his career with Strategy (formerly known as MicroStrategy) in 1999, where he held several senior roles, including senior executive vice president, CTO, and CIO.

In 2015, Xiao moved his professional focus to the UAE technology sector, where he served three years as the CEO of Pegasus. The following year, in 2016, Xiao, who had previously held U.S. citizenship, became an Emirati citizen.

Following his role with Pegasus, Xiao became the founding Group CEO of G42, based in Abu Dhabi, in 2018. Under his leadership, the company expanded its AI and cloud computing infrastructure, including the development of G42 Cloud.

Xiao oversaw a period of expansion and external investment, including G42's acquisition of Bayanat in January 2020 and the establishment of its subsidiary Presight, also in 2020, both of which were later listed on the Abu Dhabi Securities Exchange. The following year, in 2021, the U.S. private equity firm Silver Lake acquired an $800 million minority stake in G42.

Following scrutiny from U.S. officials and congressional committees regarding G42's ties to Chinese technology companies, the company reduced its exposure to Chinese investments and phased out Chinese hardware suppliers to address the export control and national security concerns. These changes occurred under the leadership of Xiao.

In April 2024, Microsoft announced a $1.5 billion investment in G42, acquiring a minority stake in the company and expanding an existing strategic partnership focused on AI and cloud infrastructure. Xiao stated that the agreement was expected to expand G42's AI capabilities through integration with Microsoft's cloud infrastructure.

At Davos in January 2024, Xiao described G42's concept of "Intelligence Grid," an approach for connecting AI capabilities across organizations and regions. Xiao said the term was coined at Davos and described the initiative as aimed at establishing an interconnected AI ecosystem that could broaden access to intelligence capabilities. In October 2024, G42 formally presented the Intelligence Grid at GITEX Global, describing it as an AI infrastructure framework designed to integrate computing resources, cloud infrastructure, data centers, connectivity, and AI solutions across sectors including government, healthcare, and energy. At the October 2025 GITEX Global conference in Dubai, Xiao co-headlined a session with OpenAI CEO Sam Altman, titled "From early adoption to AI-native nations: Shaping the next era of intelligence."

Xiao has overseen G42's international partnerships, including collaborations on infrastructure projects in Italy, France, the U.S., Vietnam, and India. During his tenure, it was announced that G42 would develop a 10-square-mile AI campus in collaboration with U.S. firms. The 5GW UAE-US AI campus was launched in Abu Dhabi in May 2025 in front of Sheikh Mohamed bin Zayed Al Nahyan, President of the UAE, and President Donald Trump.

In early 2026, Xiao announced the first 200-megawatt phase of the project was expected to become operational later that year. Also in 2026, Xiao ranked 1st on Forbes Middle East's 2026 Top Tech CEO's.

== Board memberships ==
In 2019, Xiao joined the board of the Mohamed bin Zayed University of Artificial Intelligence (MBZUAI) as a founding board member following the establishment of the university.

In January 2024, Xiao was appointed as a council member of the Abu Dhabi Artificial Intelligence and Advanced Technology Council (AIATC) upon its official establishment. Following the launch of MGX in March 2024, Xiao joined the board of directors.

In July 2025, Xiao joined the Cleveland Clinic Abu Dhabi as chairman of the board of directors.
