= Andrew Feldman (businessman) =

American technology entrepreneur and CEO of Cerebras Systems

- Born: Andrew D. Feldman; Palo Alto, California, U.S.
- Education: Stanford University (B.A., 1991); Stanford Graduate School of Business (M.B.A., 1997)
- Occupations: Entrepreneur; Technology executive
- Employer: Cerebras Systems
- Known for: Co-founding Cerebras Systems; developing the wafer-scale AI processor
- Title: Co-founder and CEO, Cerebras Systems

Andrew D. Feldman is an American technology entrepreneur best known as the co-founder and chief executive officer (CEO) of Cerebras Systems, a semiconductor and artificial intelligence infrastructure company. Cerebras is known for developing the wafer-scale engine (WSE), the largest processor in the history of the computing industry. Feldman previously co-founded SeaMicro, which was acquired by Advanced Micro Devices (AMD) in 2012.

As of July 2026 Forbes estimates his net worth to be $1.9 billion.

== Early life and education ==
Feldman was born and raised in Palo Alto, California. His parents were professors at Stanford University, having moved there in the mid-1960s to complete their doctoral degrees.

Feldman earned a Bachelor of Arts in Economics and Political Science from Stanford University, graduating in 1991. He returned to earn an MBA from the Stanford Graduate School of Business, graduating in 1997.

== Career ==
=== Early career ===
Feldman began his career in the Silicon Valley networking industry. He served as vice president of marketing and corporate development at Riverstone Networks from the company's founding through its initial public offering (IPO) in 2001. Following the IPO, he joined Force10 Networks as vice president of product management, marketing, and business development. Force10 Networks was subsequently acquired by Dell for approximately $800 million.

=== SeaMicro (2007–2012) ===
In 2007, Feldman co-founded SeaMicro, a company specializing in energy-efficient, high-bandwidth microservers, alongside Gary Lauterbach. He served as CEO of the company. In February 2012, Advanced Micro Devices announced an agreement to acquire SeaMicro for approximately $334 million, of which approximately $281 million would be paid in cash. Following the acquisition, Feldman joined AMD as corporate vice president, leading the company's newly established Data Center Server Solutions group.

=== Cerebras Systems (2015–present) ===
In 2015, Feldman co-founded Cerebras Systems alongside Gary Lauterbach, Michael James, Sean Lie, and Jean-Philippe Fricker, all of whom had worked together at SeaMicro. The company remained in stealth mode for several years while developing its core technology.

In August 2019, Cerebras unveiled the first-generation Wafer-Scale Engine (WSE-1), fabricated using a 16-nanometer process. Unlike conventional processors, which are cut from individual chip dies, the WSE is produced from an entire silicon wafer, making it physically the largest processor ever manufactured at the time of its release. In April 2021, Cerebras released the WSE-2, which contained 2.6 trillion transistors and 850,000 AI-optimized cores. In March 2024, the company introduced the WSE-3, built on a 5-nanometer process, containing 4 trillion transistors and 900,000 cores.

Cerebras filed for an IPO in September 2024 but withdrew the registration statement in late 2025, citing regulatory scrutiny related to the company's significant revenue concentration from a single customer, G42, a Microsoft-backed technology holding company based in the United Arab Emirates. Cerebras re-filed and on May 13, 2026, priced its IPO at $185 per share, above the expected range, raising $5.55 billion. On May 14, 2026, shares began trading on the Nasdaq Global Select Market under the ticker symbol CBRS, rising approximately 68% on the first day to give the company a market capitalization of roughly $67 billion—the largest U.S. technology IPO of the year at the time. Following the offering, Feldman's stake was valued at approximately $3.2 billion according to the Bloomberg Billionaires Index.

Feldman is a Jew who speaks a few words of Hebrew and has volunteered on a kibbutz. He champions diversity and interfaith respect in the company.

== Recognition ==
In August 2022, the Computer History Museum in Mountain View, California installed a permanent display honoring Cerebras Systems' Wafer-Scale Engine, noting it was the first time in the 70-year history of computing that wafer-scale integration had been achieved.

In 2024, Time magazine named Cerebras to its annual list of the 100 Most Influential Companies, and the CS-3 system was named one of Time's Best Inventions of 2024.
