= Foundation Capital =

American venture capital firm

- Type: Private
- Industry: Venture capital
- Founded: October 1995; 31 years ago
- Founder: Bill Elmore; Kathryn Gould; Jim Anderson
- Headquarters: Palo Alto, California, United States
- Number of employees: ~ 30 worldwide
- Website: www.foundationcap.com

Foundation Capital is a venture capital firm located in Silicon Valley. The firm was founded in 1995, and in 2012 managed more than $2.4 billion in investment capital. As of 2023, the firm has over $6 billion in assets under management.

== History ==
Foundation Capital was founded in 1995 and was one of Netflix's original investors.

Foundation Capital has invested in over 400+ companies, with more than 120 exits in the form of acquisitions or initial public offerings. Most of its investments fall under the areas of fintech, enterprise software, and consumer.

In 2013, the firm closed its seventh fund with $282 million and its eighth fund in 2015 with $325 million. In 2019, the firm closed its ninth fund with $350 million in commitments and in 2022, closed its tenth fund with $500 million in commitments after early investments in companies including Solana, Turing, Eightfold, Cerebras and Jasper. In 2024, it raised its eleventh fund, with $600 million.
