= Cirrascale Cloud Services =

American cloud computing services company

- Company type: Private
- Industry: Diversified Computer Systems
- Founded: 2010
- Founder: Dave Driggers
- Headquarters: San Diego, California, United States
- Area served: Worldwide
- Key people: David Driggers (Chairman) & (CEO) (CEO); Larry Weissman (CFO)
- Products: Deep learning infrastructure solutions

Cirrascale Cloud Services is a cloud computing services company headquartered in San Diego, California. Cirrascale was formerly Verari Technologies, founded in 2010, which acquired the technology and products of Verari Systems and changed its name to Cirrascale Corporation in August 2010. In 2017, Cirrascale Corporation sold its hardware business to BOXX Technologies and changed its name to Cirrascale Cloud Services. Cirrascale Cloud Services was purchased by Craftsman Capital Partners later in 2017.

Cirrascale Cloud Services offers deep learning infrastructure solutions for self-driving vehicles, medical imaging, and natural language processing (NLP).

== Executives ==
- David Driggers – CEO & Founder
- Larry Weissman – CFO
- Al Lucarelli – VP Sales
