= SeaMicro =

American computer server company

SeaMicro, Inc.
- Industry: Data center, Rack Storage Hardware
- Founded: 2007
- Founder: Gary Lauterbach; Andrew Feldman; Anil Rao
- Defunct: April 16, 2015
- Headquarters: Santa Clara, CA, United States
- Key people: Dhiraj Malik
- Services: Computer data storage
- Parent: AMD
- Website: www.seamicro.com

SeaMicro, Inc. was a subsidiary of AMD that specialized in the ultra-dense computer server industry. It ceased operations on 16 April 2015.

== History ==
In July 2007, Andrew Feldman, Gary Lauterbach, and Anil Rao founded SeaMicro. Series A investments from Crosslink Capital and Draper Fisher Jurvetson closed in December 2007. Khosla Ventures led the series B investment round in 2009. In 2012, SeaMicro was acquired by AMD for $334 million. The application of MicroSea servers were most prominent in data centers, such as the Gene Center at LMU Munich for scientific research. In 2013, SeaMicro AMD collaborated with Verizon Communications to power its new cloud services. It has empowered Verizon to introduce fine-grained server configuration options that allow for more flexibility in instance-sizing by allowing administrators to select a processor speed between 500 MHz and 2 GHz and to scale DRAM up and down in 512 MB increments.

== Products ==
The first product from SeaMicro was the SM10000, along with the SM10000-XE, which achieved Red Hat Certification in 2011 when operating on Red Hat Enterprise Linux. A more recent model, The SeaMicro SM15000 was also designed to support Citrix Xen Servers, VMware ESXi software, and both Linux and Microsoft Windows Operating systems. Specifications of newer versions have reached computing benchmarks of 5 petabytes of storage, 64 CPUs, a 1,000 virtual machine capacity, and 1.28 Tb/s of bandwidth. Another product of interest is the 10U Rack Unit, which can provide a total of 2,048 CPU cores, and 16 TBs of RAM with data transferred through a custom "Freedom Fabric" for supercomputers unique to SeaMicro microservers.

== Awards ==
- GigaOM: GreenNet 2011: 10 Big Ideas Winners
- Silicon Valley/ San Jose Journal: Best Emerging Cleantech Company 2011
- 2011 Best Electronic Design Winners: Computer Category
- Platts: 2011 Rising Star award
