= Marianne Walck =

American academic

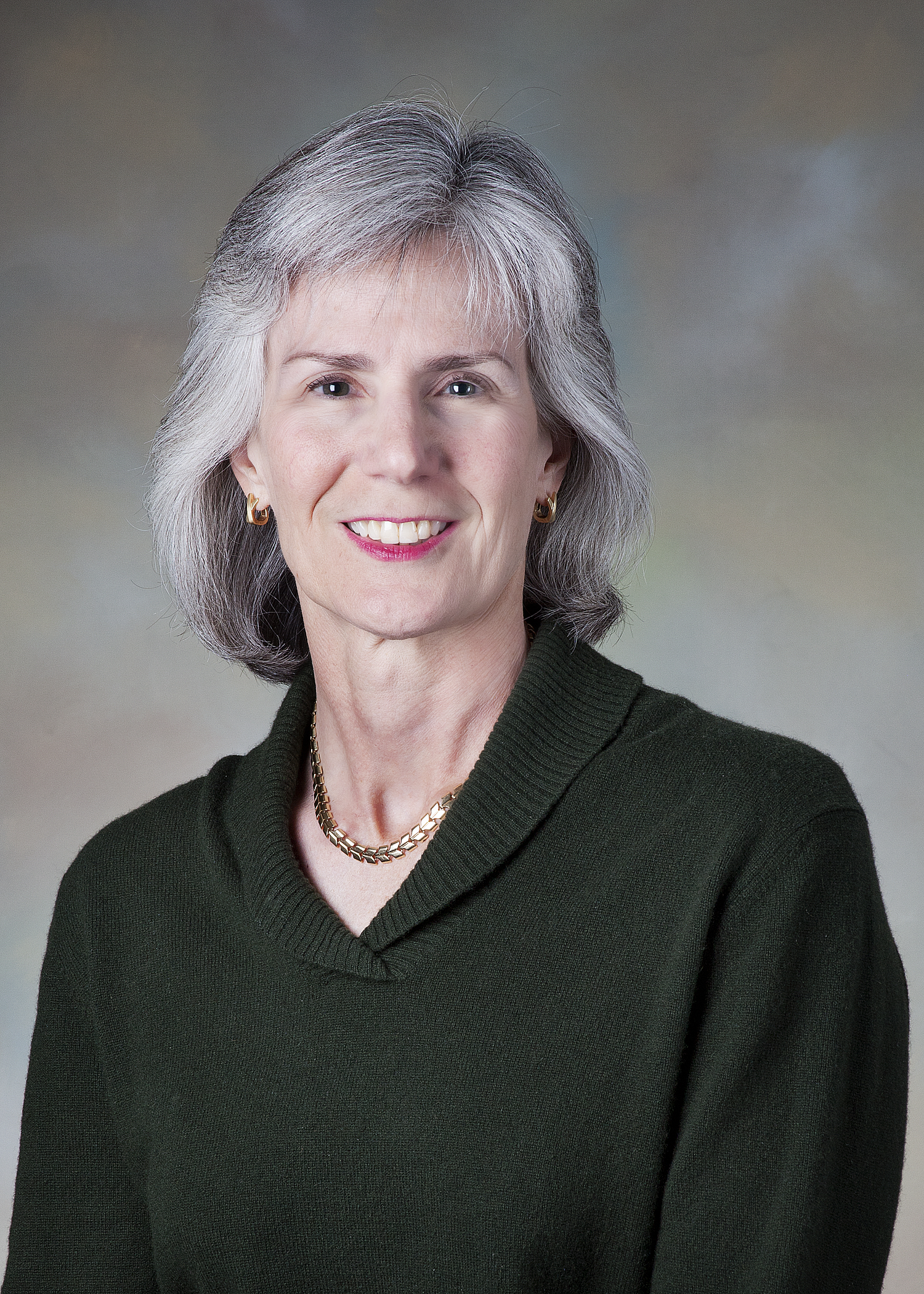
- Walck in 2012

Former Director of the National Energy Technology Laboratory
- In office 2024–2026
- Preceded by: Sean Plasynski (acting); Brian J. Anderson
- Scientific career
- Education: California Institute of Technology; Hope College
- Fields: Geophysics
- Workplaces: Sandia National Laboratories; Idaho National Laboratory
- Thesis: Teleseismic array analysis of upper mantle compressional velocity structure (1984)
- Doctoral advisor: Don L. Anderson

Marianne C. Walck is the former Director of the National Energy Technology Laboratory. She previously served as Vice President of the Sandia National Laboratories, where she led Sandia's California Laboratory and its Energy and Climate Program, and as the Chief Research Officer at the Idaho National Laboratory.

== Early life and education ==
Walck studied physics and geology at Hope College, which she graduated in 1978. She earned master's and doctorate degrees in geophysics at the California Institute of Technology. For her doctorate (1984), Walck worked on teleseismic array analysis of upper mantle velocity structure with Robert Clayton and Don Anderson. Her subsequent research considered subsurface energy sources and treaty verification.

== Research and career ==
Walck joined Sandia National Laboratories in 1984. After 6 years as a research scientist, she served as manager of the Geophysics Department. Her group conducted geophysical R&D, including monitoring subsurface processes using microseismic monitoring. In 2003, she was named Senior Manager for Nuclear Energy Safety Technologies, where Walck was responsible for five research and development groups, working on a range of topics including civilian nuclear power and the transportation of nuclear waste. This involved studies for the Nuclear Regulatory Commission, where she assessed the vulnerabilities of nuclear power plants to terrorist attacks. Her group's efforts were used during the Fukushima Daiichi nuclear disaster. Starting in 2011, Walck also served as associate director of the United States Department of Energy Center for Frontiers of Energy Security.

While Vice President for Sandia's California Laboratory (2015–2017), she was responsible for a 1300-person site in Livermore, CA that performed research and development in nuclear security and energy. Walck also led Sandia's Energy and Climate program, which conducted research and development in the full spectrum of energy sources and systems including renewable energy, transportation energy systems and the nuclear fuel cycle. She was associate director of CFSES, the Center for Frontiers of Subsurface Energy Security, a collaboration between the University of Texas at Austin and Sandia National Laboratories.

Walck retired from Sandia National Laboratories in 2017. She was announced as the deputy director for Science and Technology of the Idaho National Laboratory in 2018. In this capacity, she led research, science and technology at INL. In 2024, Walck became Director of the National Energy Technology Laboratory. She retired in 2026. Walck is a Distinguished Expert for the California Council on Science and Technology, and serves on a variety of advisory panels.

In 2023, Walck was elected as a Fellow of the American Association for the Advancement of Science.

== Personal life ==
Walck is married with two children. She is a violinist in her local community orchestra.
