= Mohamed bin Zayed University of Artificial Intelligence =

Public university in Abu Dhabi, UAE

Mohamed Bin Zayed University of Artificial Intelligence
- Arabic: جامعة محمد بن زايد للذكاء الاصطناعي
- Type: Public university
- Established: April 2020; 6 years ago
- Chairman: Khaldoon Khalifa Al Mubarak
- President: Eric Xing
- Location: Masdar City, Abu Dhabi, United Arab Emirates; 24°25′58″N 54°37′05″E
- Language: English
- Website: mbzuai.ac.ae

The Mohamed Bin Zayed University of Artificial Intelligence (MBZUAI) is a public university in the Masdar City community of Abu Dhabi, United Arab Emirates. It was granted a university license by the UAE Ministry of Education in April 2020. The university launched its graduate programs in January 2021 and its undergraduate program in 2025.

== History ==
The establishment of MBZUAI is part of the United Arab Emirates' strategy for Artificial Intelligence 2031. This policy seeks to "position the country as a global AI leader", and included the appointment of the world's first Minister of State for Artificial Intelligence.

Initiated in October 2019, the university was named after Mohamed bin Zayed Al Nahyan and the board of trustees was chaired by Sultan Ahmed Al Jaber, while its advisory board was chaired by Omar Al Olama, the UAE's first Minister of State for Artificial Intelligence.

The Ministry of Education accredited six MBZUAI graduate programs in February 2020 and granted a university license in April 2020. The initial class of graduate students were to start coursework in the fall of 2020, but due to the COVID-19 pandemic this was delayed to January 2021. At the time classes began the university had 11 faculty members and 78 students (13 PhD and 65 MSc) in machine learning and computer vision. Due to pandemic restrictions the first classes were held online using Moodle software. The first in-person classes began in the fall of 2021.

The first cohort of MSc students graduated in January 2023. By 2024, at least 25 additional faculty members had been recruited, and departments had been established in robotics, computer science, and statistics and data science. The first undergraduate program at MBZUAI, the "Bachelor of Science in Artificial Intelligence (Engineering/Business)" degree program, was introduced in March 2025.

== Campus ==
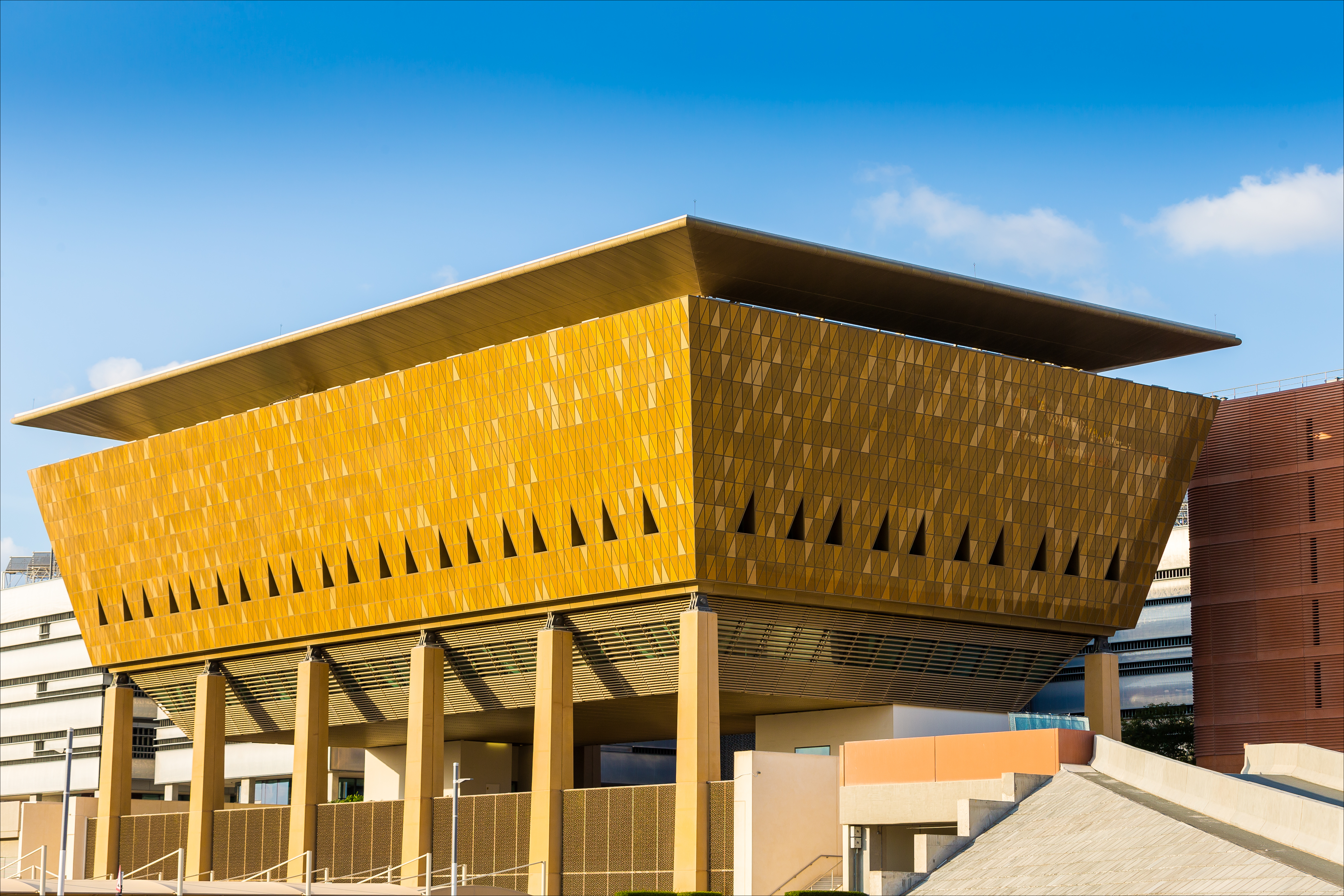
Multi-use hall on the MBZUAI campus

MBZUAI is located in Masdar City, a sustainable urban community designed as a smart innovation cluster. The campus uses low-carbon transportation methods, including electric buses and golf carts.

When classes began in 2021, the university had only six classrooms, most of which could accommodate class sizes of no larger than 20 students. Shortly afterward the classrooms were redesigned to better accommodate remote and hybrid learning options and more flexible layouts, such as having an instructor in one classroom broadcast a lecture to the other classrooms and to online students.

The campus also includes a gymnasium, swimming pool, and squash and badminton courts.

== Administration ==
The current president, Eric Xing, joined in January 2021. Sir J. Michael Brady served as the founding, interim president. Professor Ling Shao was the founding provost and executive vice president. Timothy Baldwin was appointed provost in April 2024. As of 2025, the Board of Trustees was chaired by Khaldoon Khalifa Al Mubarak.

== Academics ==
The goal of the university is "producing a new generation of AI leaders and experts". According to The Economist, MBZUAI and the King Abdullah University of Science and Technology "have poached star professors from illustrious institutions such as the University of California, Berkeley, and Carnegie Mellon University in Pittsburgh".

MBZUAI provides undergraduate, master's, and Ph.D. programs in artificial intelligence, computer science, computer vision, machine learning, natural language processing, robotics, and statistics & data science. As of 2025 the institution had 84 faculty members and over 200 postdocs and researchers.

In October 2021, the university launched a 12-week Executive Program for leaders implementing AI in their organizations. In March 2022, the university graduated the first class of participants.

== Research ==
The university's research program has four pillars: improving services offered by the public and private sectors, enhancing efficiencies and improving productivity in industry and manufacturing, support new and emerging high-value sectors, and optimizing environmental sustainability. MBZUAI has a joint AI research program with the Weizmann Institute of Science in Israel.

In May 2025, MBZUAI launched the Institute for Foundation Models (IFM). It coordinated the development of Jais, a large language model for Arabic, to be used by the Emirati government for administrative functions. Other research hubs include the Center for Integrative Artificial Intelligence, the Metaverse Center, and the Institute of Digital Public Health. It also has a business incubator and a joint lab with the Abu Dhabi Digital Authority to support government service initiatives. On 3 September 2026, IFM released the K2 Horizon language model family, with six models across orders of magnitude from 375 billion to 0.9 billion parameters. It claimed a fully open-source artificial intelligence approach, "with weights, code, training data, and methodology", in contrast to just open weights. Artificial Analysis benchmarked its largest model below the leading open weights Chinese LLMs and Korea's Motif 3 model, but above the leading open model from the US, Inkling, and from the EU, Mistral AI's Medium 3.5.

== Student life ==
The university provides graduate students with a full scholarship support package, including a monthly stipend, health insurance, and accommodations, "in exchange for full-time commitment to studying and researching in the field of AI". This approach is designed to "attract students who would otherwise have gone to well-established hubs in the West or China".

The 2024 intake included 209 students (147 MSc and 62 PhD) from 36 countries. Many students are Chinese and 31% are women. The student-faculty ratio is 5:1.

As of 2024, 212 students had graduated from the master's and PhD programs. Most stay in the region after graduation. More than half pursue industry internships during their program, and many participate in hackathons or research conferences.

== See also ==
- List of universities in the United Arab Emirates
