= G42 (company) =

Emirati artificial intelligence company

Group 42 Holding Ltd
- Type: Private
- Industry: Artificial intelligence; cloud computing
- Founded: 2018; 8 years ago
- Headquarters: Abu Dhabi, United Arab Emirates
- Area served: Middle East, Africa, Central Asia, Europe, United States
- Key people: Tahnoun bin Zayed Al Nahyan (chairman); Peng Xiao (CEO)
- Number of employees: 25,000 (2024)
- Subsidiaries: Khazna; Inception; AIQ; Presight; CPX; Space42; AstraTech; Analog; M42; Core42
- Website: g42.ai

Group 42 Holding Ltd, doing business as G42, is an Emirati artificial intelligence (AI) development holding company founded in 2018 and based in Abu Dhabi, United Arab Emirates. It focuses on developing and deploying AI systems at scale through infrastructure and cloud-based platforms used across government and enterprise sectors, including healthcare and energy applications, as part of its broader AI ecosystem.

The company is chaired by Tahnoon bin Zayed Al Nahyan from the ruling family of the UAE, and Peng Xiao serves as founder and Group CEO.

Group 42 was reported to be the sole registered shareholder of the messaging app ToTok.

== Governance ==
The company is chaired by the National Security Advisor of the UAE, Tahnoon bin Zayed Al Nahyan, who is also its controlling shareholder.

Peng Xiao is the founder, group chief executive officer, and a member of the board of directors.

The Board of Directors includes Khaldoon Khalifa Al Mubarak, managing director and group chief executive officer of Mubadala Investment Company; Jassem Mohamed Bu Ataba Al Zaabi, chairman of the Abu Dhabi Department of Finance; Brad Smith, president and vice chair of Microsoft; Egon Durban, co-chief executive officer of Silver Lake; and Martin Edelman.

== History ==
=== 2018–2019 ===
G42 was founded in 2018 and is based in Abu Dhabi, UAE. The company applies research and development and deploys AI solutions through its portfolio companies across various industries.

In December 2019, Group 42 announced signing an agreement of strategic partnership with Abu Dhabi Developmental Holding Company (ADDH) to establish a joint venture called Adalytyx.

As of 2019, G42 was reported by The New York Times to be the sole registered shareholder of ToTok, a messaging, video, and voice-calling application. The app was widely downloaded in multiple regions. In December 2019, The New York Times reported allegations that the application was used for surveillance purposes. Following the report, ToTok was removed from the Apple App Store and Google Play Store.

=== 2020 ===
In January 2020, G42 announced the acquisition of Bayanat for Mapping and Surveying Services LLC, an end-to-end provider of geospatial data products and services. In 2020, state-owned Mubadala Investment Company took a stake in the company, transferring ownership of two information technology companies, Injazat and Khazna, to G42.

In June 2020, G42 partnered with Sinopharm for clinical trials of a COVID-19 vaccine and in March 2021, they decided to produce the vaccine in Abu Dhabi.

In July 2020, G42 announced the signing of a memorandum of understanding with the two Israeli defense groups, Rafael Advanced Defense Systems and Israel Aerospace Industries to research and develop methods to combat the COVID-19 pandemic, which the Israeli subsidiary Elta confirmed.

In 2020, reports stated that G42 was involved in the distribution of COVID-19 testing kits manufactured by BGI Group in Nevada. Some U.S. officials raised concerns regarding data privacy and the use of genetic sequencing technology. During the same period, reports also stated that G42 was cooperating with BGI on a genomics initiative in the UAE to develop a population-scale genetic dataset.

=== 2021–2023 ===
In April 2021, American private equity firm Silver Lake invested $800 million for a minority stake in G42.

In July 2023, G42 entered an agreement with Cerebras to develop and deploy AI supercomputing systems using Cerebras’ hardware. The initial deployment was reported to be valued at approximately $100 million and was intended for AI applications, including large-scale data analysis and healthcare-related workloads. The systems were described as providing high-performance computing capacity for AI training.

In October 2023, a partnership was announced with OpenAI, the AI research and deployment company responsible for ChatGPT. In November 2023, the 42X Fund, associated with G42 acquired a $100 million stake in ByteDance, which was divested approximately four months later amid efforts to reassure U.S. partners. The same month, The New York Times reported that U.S. officials had expressed concerns about G42’s technology partnerships, including the use of Huawei equipment and its interactions with Chinese companies such as BGI Group. Following the report, G42 stated that it would phase out Huawei equipment.

=== 2024 ===
In January 2024, the United States House Select Committee on the Strategic Competition between the United States and the Chinese Communist Party requested export controls on G42 and related companies. In response, G42 stated in February 2024 that it had divested from investments in China.

In March 2024, the Abu Dhabi government launched an investment firm specializing in AI technologies called MGX, with G42 and Mubadala as founding partners.

In April 2024, Microsoft announced a $1.5 billion investment in G42. As part of the agreement, Microsoft's president, Brad Smith, joined G42's board of directors, and the company adopted Microsoft Azure as a core platform for AI development and deployment.

In July 2024, members of the committee requested a U.S. government review of G42’s foreign ties in relation to the proposed investment by Microsoft, which was subsequently structured with additional oversight provisions.

At GITEX Global in October 2024, G42 presented its "Intelligence Grid", described in reporting as a framework within its broader ecosystem that integrates AI infrastructure, cloud services, and large-scale computing systems to support national-scale artificial intelligence deployment.

=== 2025–present ===
In February 2025, G42 and DataOne partnered to create an AI data center in France that will be powered by AMD hardware and Core42’s infrastructure. That same month, G42 and Microsoft launched the Responsible AI Foundation, an initiative aimed at promoting responsible AI standards and governance frameworks in the Middle East and Global South. The initiative includes collaboration with the Mohamed bin Zayed University of Artificial Intelligence.

On May 22, 2025, G42 announced the Stargate UAE AI infrastructure project in partnership with OpenAI, Oracle, NVIDIA, SoftBank Group, and Cisco. The project, based in Abu Dhabi, involves the development of large-scale computing infrastructure in the UAE, with G42 acting as a regional partner in its implementation. Reporting described plans for phased deployment of high-capacity AI computing infrastructure, with initial operations expected to begin in 2026.

Also in May 2025, U.S. and UAE officials announced an agreement involving the development of an AI campus in the UAE. Later reporting indicated ongoing policy discussions regarding access to advanced semiconductor technologies, including security conditions governing access to AI chips. The U.S. Department of Commerce later authorized the export of advanced semiconductors equivalent to 35,000 Nvidia Blackwell chips to G42 in November 2025.

In June 2025, G42 launched its European unit, G42 Europe & UK, following investment pledges of up to $52 billion in French data centers and $40 billion in Italy. Also in June 2025, G42 was named as part of the Time 100 Most Influential Companies list.

In January 2026, G42 launched a framework referred to as "Digital Embassies" involving agreements related to the governance of cloud and computing infrastructure across jurisdictions. The framework was described as addressing data sovereignty considerations for cross-border digital infrastructure.

In February 2026, G42 signed a framework agreement with a Vietnamese consortium to explore the development of AI and cloud infrastructure in Vietnam, including plans for data center capacity supported by proposed investment commitments of up to US$1 billion. The same month, it was announced that G42 would build a national-scale supercomputer for India. The company also signed a Responsible AI agreement with Credo AI at the India AI Impact Summit.

Also in February 2026, G42 announced a framework related to governance and assurance mechanisms for AI infrastructure using advanced U.S.-origin semiconductors. The initiative was described as addressing regulatory compliance and oversight considerations for AI systems deployed across distributed infrastructure. It was announced in the context of broader international discussions on AI governance, including initiatives such as the Pax Silica Declaration.

In May 2026, G42 launched sovereign AI infrastructure partnerships in the US, France, and Italy to establish governed AI ecosystems. In July 2026, the U.S. reclassified the UAE to Country Group A:5 under its export control regulations, easing restrictions on exports of advanced AI technologies. Additionally, G42 was designated as an authorized receiving entity, allowing eligible U.S. exporters to ship certain advanced AI chips to the company without obtaining individual export licenses under specified conditions.

== Portfolio companies ==
=== AIQ ===
AIQ was established in October 2020 as a joint venture between ADNOC and G42, focused on AI applications for the energy sector. It was formed following an agreement signed in November 2019. Under the original structure, ADNOC held a 60% stake, and G42 held 40%. The company integrates industrial data with AI and high-performance computing to develop energy-sector applications.

In May 2024, Presight AI acquired a 51% stake in AIQ, with ADNOC retaining a 49% shareholding. The company continues to operate as an independent entity within Presight's portfolio.

In 2025, AIQ announced a three-year, $340 million contract with ADNOC to deploy its ENERGYai platform for upstream operations.

=== Khazna Data Centers ===
In November 2020, G42 acquired Khazna Data Centers from Mubadala Investment Company as part of a broader transaction that also included the transfer of Injazat to G42, with Mubadala retaining a minority stake in the group. At the time, Khazna operated three data centers with a combined IT load capacity of 40MW.

In October 2021, G42 and e& (formerly Etisalat Group) announced the consolidation of their data center facilities into the UAE's largest data center provider. The joint venture, which concluded in 2022, operated with G42 holding a 60% stake and e& holding a 40% stake. The merger consolidated 12 facilities into a network with a projected capacity of 300MW.

During the GITEX Global 2024 exhibition, Khazna announced the development of a 100MW data center in Ajman, designed for AI workloads, representing the largest individual data center in the company's portfolio.

In February 2025, e& announced it would be divesting its 40% stake in Khazna to G42, Silver Lake, and MGX.

=== Presight ===
Presight is a data analytics and AI subsidiary of G42, founded in 2020. It develops large-scale analytics systems, including the Transformative Analytics Quotient (TAQ), used for predictive analytics applications in public sector and enterprise environments.

In March 2023, Presight was listed on the Abu Dhabi Securities Exchange following an initial public offering that raised approximately $496 million.

In February 2025, Presight entered a six-year, $190 million contract with the municipal government of Astana, Kazakhstan, to launch a smart city project in the city. The project is intended to deploy AI technologies for traffic management, public safety, and public services.

=== M42 ===
In October 2022, G42 Healthcare and Mubadala Health announced a merger to form an integrated healthcare technology company combining data-driven health services and clinical infrastructure. The entity was launched as M42 in April 2023.

Its portfolio included healthcare and diagnostics providers such as Biogenix Labs, HealthPoint Hospital, Moorfields Eye Hospital Abu Dhabi, and the Imperial College London Diabetes Centre. Since its launch, M42 has expanded its operations to include over 20,000 employees and a network of more than 480 clinics across 26 countries.

=== AstraTech ===
In December 2022, G42 was announced as the lead investor in a $500 million funding round for Astra Tech, a Dubai-based consumer technology group. The investment supported the development of an "ultra platform," a digital ecosystem designed to integrate communications, financial services, and e-commerce into a single interface.

Following the investment, Astra Tech expanded its platform through acquisitions, including the communications application botim, which was integrated into its broader consumer ecosystem.

=== Inception ===
Inception, formerly known as the Inception Institute of Artificial Intelligence, is an artificial intelligence research and applied AI entity within the G42 group focused on machine learning, large language models, and sector-specific AI applications.

In August 2023, Inception was involved in the launch of Jais, an Arabic-English large language model developed in collaboration with MBZUAI and Cerebras Systems. In October 2023, Inception was merged with G42 Cloud and Injazat to form Core42. It was later re-established as a standalone entity in 2024. Following this restructuring, Inception continued development of large language models, including the Jais model family.

InceptionClaw, the company's sovereign, enterprise-grade AI super assistant, was launched in May 2026.

=== Core42 ===
Core42 was launched in October 2023 through the merger of G42 Cloud, Injazat, and Inception. The consolidation brought together G42's cloud computing, infrastructure, and AI capabilities into a unified platform focused on large-scale digital infrastructure and enterprise AI services.

In February 2026, the Central Bank of the UAE announced a partnership with Core42, a subsidiary of G42, to develop a sovereign financial cloud services infrastructure to provide a centralized and regulated cloud environment for the UAE's financial sector.

=== CPX ===
In October 2024, G42 announced the acquisition of CPX, a cybersecurity firm based in Abu Dhabi. Prior to the acquisition, CPX provided digital security services to government and enterprise clients, including critical infrastructure operators.

=== Space42 ===
Space42 was formed in October 2024 through a merger of Bayanat and Yahsat. The company is publicly listed on the Abu Dhabi Securities Exchange. It integrates satellite communications capabilities with geospatial and AI applications. The company operates two main divisions: Space Infrastructure and Applied AI, serving as the space-tech pillar of G42's broader technology ecosystem.

== See also ==
- Finablr
- LocAI
