= BCD (character encoding) =

Six-bit binary-coded decimal codes

BCD Interchange Codes
- Classification: 6-bit alphanumeric basic Latin encodings
- Succeeded by: EBCDIC

BCD (binary-coded decimal), also called alphanumeric BCD, alphameric BCD, BCD Interchange Code, or BCDIC, is a family of representations of numerals, uppercase Latin letters, and some special and control characters as six-bit character codes.

Unlike later encodings such as ASCII, BCD codes were not standardized. Different computer manufacturers, and even different product lines from the same manufacturer, often had their own variants, and sometimes included unique characters. Other six-bit encodings with completely different mappings, such as some FIELDATA variants or Transcode, are sometimes incorrectly termed BCD.

Many variants of BCD encode the characters '0' through '9' as the corresponding binary values.

== History ==
Technically, binary-coded decimal describes the encoding of decimal numbers where each decimal digit is represented by a fixed number of bits, usually four.

With the introduction of the IBM card in 1928, IBM created a code (Note: There are actually multiple card codes, e.g., by 1964 there were ten versions of the IBM 026 with slightly different character sets.) capable of representing alphanumeric information, later adopted by other manufacturers. This code represents the numbers 0-9 by a single punch, and uses multiple punches for upper-case letters and special characters. A letter has two punches (zone [12,11,0] + digit [1–9]); most special characters have two or three punches (zone [12,11,0,or none] + digit [2–7] + 8).

The BCD code is the adaptation of the punched card code to a six-bit binary code by encoding the digit rows (nine rows, plus unpunched) into the low four bits, and the zone rows (three rows, plus unpunched) into the high two bits. The digit zero (a single punch in row 0) is usually handled specially in some way, and the digit code was extended to values 10 through 15 by combining a digit in the range 2–7 with a punch in row 8. IBM applied the terms binary-coded decimal and BCD to the variations of BCD alphamerics used in most early IBM computers, including the IBM 1620, IBM 1400 series, and non-Decimal Architecture members of the IBM 700/7000 series.

Among the vendors using BCD were Burroughs, Bull, CDC, IBM, General Electric (the computer division was purchased by Honeywell in 1969), NCR, Siemens, and Sperry-UNIVAC.

IBM announced the 8-bit Extended Binary Coded Decimal Interchange Code (EBCDIC), based on BCDIC, in 1964 with the introduction of its System/360 line.

== Special characters ==
The Recordmark or Record mark character (represented as ‡) is a character used to mark the end of a record. The BCD code for this character is 32_{8} in some BCD variants. The closest Unicode equivalent is U+29E7 ⧧ THERMODYNAMIC, but that is not found in many fonts, so U+2021 ‡ DOUBLE DAGGER is often used instead. Functionally this corresponds to the EBCDIC IRS character (ASCII RS), X'1E'.

The Groupmark or Group mark character (represented as) is a character used to indicate the start or finish of a group of related fields. The BCD code for this character is 77_{8} in some BCD variants. The groupmark was proposed for Unicode standardization in 2015, and was assigned to value U+2BD2 ⯒ GROUP MARK. Functionally this corresponds to the EBCDIC IGS character (ASCII GS), X'1D'. It is now in Unicode 10.0 at this position, but only the Symbola and Unifont fonts support it.

The Wordmark, by contrast, is not a BCD character. Rather, it is a flag bit used to mark the end of a word on some variable word length computers such as the IBM 1401.

== BCD code variations ==
There are many different versions of the six-bit BCD code. There are three major categories of difference:

1. The mapping from zone punches to high-order bits. All codes translate no zone punches to a bit pattern of 00, but some encode the zone punches in 12-11-0 order, preserving alphabetical order, while others use 0-11-12 order, resulting in a partially reversed alphabet.
2. The handling of the digit 0. The straightforward translation from punched form would place the blank before digits 1–9, and encode 0 at the start of the line with 'S' in it. All codes have some special-case handling which either translates the digit 0 to the all-zero binary code (and moves the blank elsewhere), or gives it binary code 001010 (decimal 10) and moves the 8+2 punch elsewhere.
3. The assignment of special characters. The characters assigned to codes beyond the basic alphanumeric set varied widely, even within one model of computer. For example, some computers (Note: E.g., IBM 702, IBM 705) had the percent and lozenge (U+2311 ⌑ SQUARE LOZENGE) at the same codes as left and right parentheses in other (Note: E.g., IBM 701, IBM 704.) encodings.

In "Spanish speaking countries", the character "Ñ" did not exist in the original system, therefore "@" was chosen by most manufacturers: Bull, NCR, and Control Data, but there was an inconsistency when merging databases to 7-bit ASCII code, for in that coding system the "/" character was chosen, resulting in two different codes for the same character.

== Examples of BCD codes ==
The following charts show the numeric values of BCD characters in hexadecimal (base-16) notation, as that most clearly reflects the structure of 4-bit binary coded decimal, plus two extra bits. For example, the code for 'A', in row 3x and column x1, is hexadecimal 31, or binary '11 0001'.

=== Tape style ===
==== 48-character BCD code ====
The first versions of BCDIC had 48 characters, as they were based on card punch patterns and the character sets of printers, neither of which encouraged having a power-of-two number of characters.

IBM 48-character BCDIC code
	x0	x1	x2	x3	x4	x5	x6	x7	x8	x9	xA	xB	xC	xD	xE	xF
0x	space	1	2	3	4	5	6	7	8	9	0	#	@			
1x		/	S	T	U	V	W	X	Y	Z		,	%			
2x	-	J	K	L	M	N	O	P	Q	R		$	*			
3x	&	A	B	C	D	E	F	G	H	I		.	⌑			

This was based on a 40-character punched card code; the original 37 (10 digits, 26 letters, and blank), plus three commercially important characters added around 1932: hyphen-minus used for printing credit balances and hyphenated names, the ampersand also used in many names and addresses (Procter & Gamble, Mr. & Mrs. Smith), and the asterisk used to overprint unused fields when printing cheques.

==== IBM 1401 BCD code ====
Rather than following the IBM 704's storage representation, IBM 1401 followed the tape representation (descended from the 48-character BCD), thus using the all-zero code for blank and the code 10 (0x0A) for the digit zero. It had defined character forms for all possible values, for documentation purposes, but only 48 of the 63 non-blank characters were printable, and there was considerable variation in how the other code values (shaded in the table below) were depicted in practice. Even the other characters varied between different available print chains for the IBM 1403 printer.

	x0	x1	x2	x3	x4	x5	x6	x7	x8	x9	xA	xB	xC	xD	xE	xF
0x	space	1	2	3	4	5	6	7	8	9	0	#	@	:	>	√
1x	¢	/	S	T	U	V	W	X	Y	Z	⧧	,	%	=	'	"
2x	-	J	K	L	M	N	O	P	Q	R	!	$	*	)	;	Δ
3x	&	A	B	C	D	E	F	G	H	I	?	.	⌑	(	<	⯒

==== Code page 353 ====
The BCDIC-A Code page was assigned as Code page 353, also known as CP353. Some of the characters in this code page are not in Unicode. (The duplication of '#' can be found in IBM's own documentation and is not a mistake here.)

	x0	x1	x2	x3	x4	x5	x6	x7	x8	x9	xA	xB	xC	xD	xE	xF
0x	space	1	2	3	4	5	6	7	8	9	0	#	@	:	>	√
1x	␢	/	S	T	U	V	W	X	Y	Z	⧧	,	%	γ	\	⧻
2x	-	J	K	L	M	N	O	P	Q	R	!	#	*	]	;	Δ
3x	&	A	B	C	D	E	F	G	H	I	?	.	⌑	[	<	⯒

At 0x1A is the record mark. At 0x3F is the group mark.

==== Code page 354 ====
The BCDIC-B Code page was assigned as Code page 354, also known as CP354. Some of the characters in this code page are not in Unicode.

	x0	x1	x2	x3	x4	x5	x6	x7	x8	x9	xA	xB	xC	xD	xE	xF
0x	space	1	2	3	4	5	6	7	8	9	0	⊙	'	:	>	√
1x	␢	/	S	T	U	V	W	X	Y	Z	⧧	,	(	γ	\	⧻
2x	-	J	K	L	M	N	O	P	Q	R	!	#	*	]	;	Δ
3x	+	A	B	C	D	E	F	G	H	I	?	.	)	[	<	⯒

At 0x1A is the record mark. At 0x3F is the group mark.

==== PTTC/BCD code pages ====
PTTC/BCD had 5 options. There were five code pages. They are shown below. The PTTC/BCD Standard Option was assigned as Code page 355, or CP355.

	x0	x1	x2	x3	x4	x5	x6	x7	x8	x9	xA	xB	xC	xD	xE	xF
0x	space	1	2	3	4	5	6	7	8	9	0	#				
1x	@	/	S	T	U	V	W	X	Y	Z	⧧	,		γ		
2x	-	J	K	L	M	N	O	P	Q	R	<	$				
3x	&	A	B	C	D	E	F	G	H	I	)	.				

The PTTC/BCD H Option was assigned as Code page 357, or CP357.

	x0	x1	x2	x3	x4	x5	x6	x7	x8	x9	xA	xB	xC	xD	xE	xF
0x	space	1	2	3	4	5	6	7	8	9	0	=				
1x	'	/	S	T	U	V	W	X	Y	Z	⧧	,				
2x	-	J	K	L	M	N	O	P	Q	R	!	$				
3x	+	A	B	C	D	E	F	G	H	I	?	.				

The PTTC/BCD Correspondence Option was assigned as Code page 358, or CP358.

	x0	x1	x2	x3	x4	x5	x6	x7	x8	x9	xA	xB	xC	xD	xE	xF
0x	space	1	2	3	4	5	6	7	8	9	0	'				
1x	!	/	S	T	U	V	W	X	Y	Z	⧧	,				
2x	-	J	K	L	M	N	O	P	Q	R	<	;				
3x	=	A	B	C	D	E	F	G	H	I	>	.				

The PTTC/BCD Monocase Option was assigned as Code page 359, or CP359.

	x0	x1	x2	x3	x4	x5	x6	x7	x8	x9	xA	xB	xC	xD	xE	xF
0x	space	1	2	3	4	5	6	7	8	9	0	#				
1x	@	/	S	T	U	V	W	X	Y	Z		,				
2x	-	J	K	L	M	N	O	P	Q	R		$				
3x	&	A	B	C	D	E	F	G	H	I		.				

The PTTC/BCD Duocase Option was assigned as Code page 360, or CP360.

	x0	x1	x2	x3	x4	x5	x6	x7	x8	x9	xA	xB	xC	xD	xE	xF
0x	space	1	2	3	4	5	6	7	8	9	0	#				
1x	@	/	S	T	U	V	W	X	Y	Z		,				
2x	-	J	K	L	M	N	O	P	Q	R		$				
3x	&	A	B	C	D	E	F	G	H	I		.				

=== IBM 704 storage style ===
==== IBM 704 BCD code ====
The IBM 704 reordered the BCDIC code to allow a normal alphabetic collating order internally, with 0 before 1 and A before Z. It could automatically translate between this internal form and the earlier BCDIC when reading and writing magnetic tapes.

The following table shows the code assignments for the IBM 704 computer. Unassigned code positions appear as blanks.

IBM 704 character set
	x0	x1	x2	x3	x4	x5	x6	x7	x8	x9	xA	xB	xC	xD	xE	xF
0x	0	1	2	3	4	5	6	7	8	9		#	@			
1x	&	A	B	C	D	E	F	G	H	I		.	⌑			
2x	-	J	K	L	M	N	O	P	Q	R		$	*			
3x	space	/	S	T	U	V	W	X	Y	Z	⧧	,	%			

( and were rarely used characters that corresponded to the punched-card convention of a digit 0 with an overpunched sign in rows 12 or 11.)

The following table shows the code assignments for the type 716 printer used starting with the IBM 704 computer and through the 7094. The 704 interface (Note: The interface on, e.g., the 7090, is different, although the software still must do mapping.) sent virtual punched-card rows to this printer, two words (72 bits) at a time, so the mapping from 6-bit BCD characters was done by software, and was not built into the printer.

IBM 716 printer character set G
	x0	x1	x2	x3	x4	x5	x6	x7	x8	x9	xA	xB	xC	xD	xE	xF
0x	*	1	2	3	4	5	6	7	8	9		+	-			
1x	+	A	B	C	D	E	F	G	H	I		.	⌑			
2x	-	J	K	L	M	N	O	P	Q	R		$	*			
3x	0	/	S	T	U	V	W	X	Y	Z		,	%			

This is a repertoire of 45 characters (not counting blank, which is handled specially by the printer), as the characters +, - and * are duplicated.

==== Fortran character set ====
There was some variation; IBM 704 Fortran had a different set of special characters (preserving only the duplicated minus sign and asterisk, period, comma, and dollar sign).

IBM 716 printer Fortran character set
	x0	x1	x2	x3	x4	x5	x6	x7	x8	x9	xA	xB	xC	xD	xE	xF
0x	*	1	2	3	4	5	6	7	8	9		=	-			
1x	+	A	B	C	D	E	F	G	H	I		.	)			
2x	-	J	K	L	M	N	O	P	Q	R		$	*			
3x	0	/	S	T	U	V	W	X	Y	Z		,	(			

A similar code was used for the IBM 709, 7090 and 7094 successors, but with some of the special characters reassigned:

IBM 7090/7094 character set
	x0	x1	x2	x3	x4	x5	x6	x7	x8	x9	xA	xB	xC	xD	xE	xF
0x	0	1	2	3	4	5	6	7	8	9		=	"			
1x	&	A	B	C	D	E	F	G	H	I		.	)			
2x	-	J	K	L	M	N	O	P	Q	R		$	*			
3x	space	/	S	T	U	V	W	X	Y	Z	±	,	(			

==== GBCD code ====
Below is the table of GE/Honeywell's GBCD code, a variant of BCD.

	x0	x1	x2	x3	x4	x5	x6	x7	x8	x9	xA	xB	xC	xD	xE	xF
0x	0	1	2	3	4	5	6	7	8	9	[	#	@	:	>	?
1x	space	A	B	C	D	E	F	G	H	I	&	.	]	(	<	\
2x	^	J	K	L	M	N	O	P	Q	R	-	$	*	)	;	'
3x	+	/	S	T	U	V	W	X	Y	Z	_	,	%	=	"	!

==== Burroughs B5500 BCD code ====
The following table shows the code assignments for the Burroughs B5500 computer, sometimes referred to as BIC (Burroughs Interchange Code).

	x0	x1	x2	x3	x4	x5	x6	x7	x8	x9	xA	xB	xC	xD	xE	xF
0x	0	1	2	3	4	5	6	7	8	9	#	@	?	:	>	≥
1x	+	A	B	C	D	E	F	G	H	I	.	[	&	(	<	←
2x	×	J	K	L	M	N	O	P	Q	R	$	*	-	)	;	≤
3x	space	/	S	T	U	V	W	X	Y	Z	,	%	≠	=	]	"

== See also ==
- Binary-coded decimal
- Six-bit character code
- EBCDIC
- SQUOZE
