= IBM 7090/94 IBSYS =

Early-to-mid 1960s operating system for the scientific line of IBM mainframes

IBSYS
- Developer: IBM
- Working state: Historic
- Initial release: 1960; 65 years ago
- Supported platforms: IBM 7090 and IBM 7094
- License: Proprietary
- Preceded by: SHARE Operating System

IBSYS is a discontinued tape-based operating system that IBM supplied with its IBM 709, IBM 7090 and IBM 7094 computers, and a significantly different, though similar operating system provided with IBM 7040 and IBM 7044 computers. IBSYS was based on FORTRAN Monitor System (FMS) and (more likely) Bell Labs' "BESYS" rather than the SHARE Operating System. IBSYS directly supported several older computer language compilers and assemblers on the $EXECUTE card: 9PAC, FORTRAN and IBSFAP. Newer language processors ran under IBJOB.

IBM later provided similar facilities for the 7040/7044 as IBM 7040/7044 Operating System (16K/32K) 7040-PR-150 and for the IBM 1410/IBM 7010 as IBM 1410/7010 Operating System 1410-PR-155.

== IBSYS System Supervisor ==
IBSYS itself is a resident monitor program, that reads control card images placed between the decks of program and data cards of individual jobs. An IBSYS control card (Note: The control cards included $* Comment $EXECUTE Call named subsystem, e.g., compiler, IBJOB, utility $IBSYS Reinitialize System Supervisor $IOCS $ID Call installation accounting routine $JOB Set up new job $STOP End a batch of jobs) begins with a "$" in column 1, immediately followed by a Control Name that selects the various IBSYS utility programs needed to set up and run the job. These card deck images are usually read from magnetic tapes prepared offline, not directly from the card reader.

== IBJOB Processor ==
The IBJOB Processor is a subsystem that runs under the IBSYS System Supervisor. It reads control cards that request, e.g., compilation, execution. The languages supported include COBOL. Commercial Translator (COMTRAN), Fortran IV (IBFTC) and Macro Assembly Program (IBMAP).

== See also ==
- University of Michigan Executive System
- Timeline of operating systems
