= IBM 740 =

Early computer graphics display, 1954

IBM 740 and 780
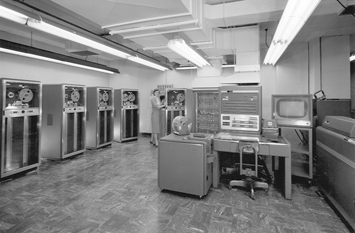
- An IBM 704 computer, with an IBM 780 CRT display (Image courtesy of LLNL)
- Also known as: IBM 740 CRT Recorder and IBM 780 CRT display
- Manufacturer: IBM
- Type: point display with generated axis
- Released: 1954
- Introductory price: US$2,850 (equivalent to $34,168 in 2025) a month rental
- Discontinued: 1959
- Media: 35 mm photographic film
- CPU: IBM 701, IBM 704, IBM 709
- Display: 7 inch CRT with P11 phosphor (740); 21 inch CRT with P7 phosphor (780)
- Graphics: 1024 x 1024 two level pixels (256 x 256 resolvable)
- Successor: IBM 2250

The IBM 740 CRT Recorder was announced in 1954 and used with the IBM 701, IBM 704, and IBM 709 computers to draw vector graphics images, point by point, on 35 mm photographic film (i.e. microfilm). The 740 film recorder contained digital-to-analog converters and a 7-inch, high precision, electrostatic CRT. The raster size was 1,024 by 1,024, but only 256 resolved spots could be displayed on a vertical or horizontal line. Points could be displayed in one of two intensities, and a line could be drawn from a point, vertically or horizontally, to the edge of the display to form an axis.

Each point to be displayed was stored in a single 36-bit word, with 10 bits each for the X and Y coordinates, and 3 control bits, one to set either high or low intensity and two to indicate that an X or Y axis is to be drawn starting from the given point. If both the X and Y axis bits were set, a 45-degree line was drawn.

The 740's CRT used a short persistence P11 phosphor. The film used was 35 mm and was stored in a magazine that could hold up to 100 feet. ASA 200 speed film was recommended. The film could be advanced under computer control.

The IBM 780 CRT Display was a monitor that could be attached to the 740 and mirror to an operator what was being drawn on 740's CRT. The 780 had a 21-inch CRT with a longer persistence (2 second, nominal) P7 phosphor.

== See also ==
- IBM 2250
- Phosphor#Standard phosphor types
