= IBM 711 =

Punched card reader for early computers

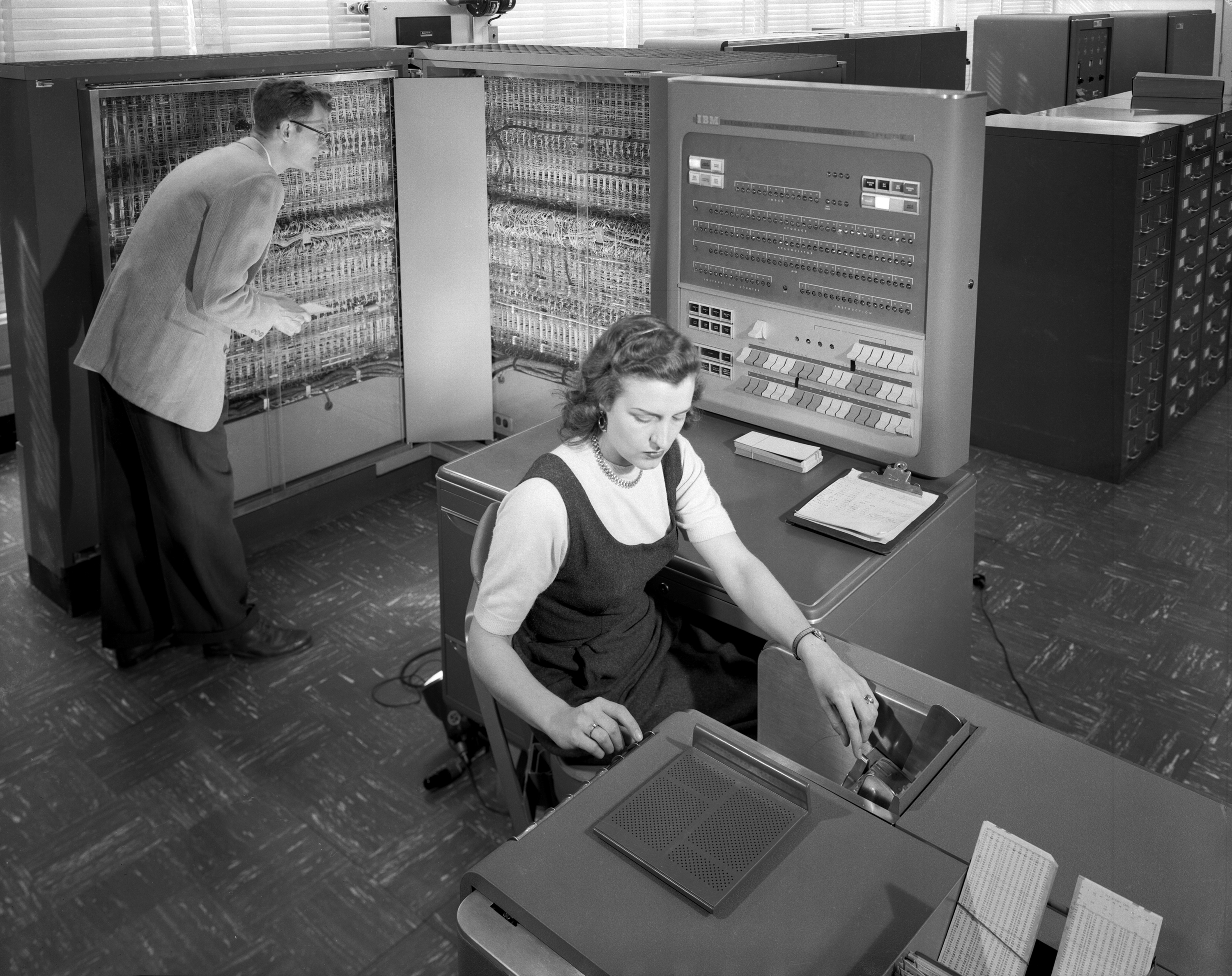
- IBM 711 card reader on an IBM 704 computer at NACA in 1957
- Type: Punch card reader
- Released: 1952; 74 years ago
- Predecessor: IBM 402
- Successor: IBM 1402

The IBM 711 was a punched card reader used as a peripheral device for IBM mainframe vacuum tube computers and early transistorized computers. Announced on May 21, 1952, it was first shipped with the IBM 701. Later IBM computers that used it were the IBM 704, the IBM 709, and the transistorized IBM 7090 and 7094.

== Overview ==
The 711's read mechanism was based on the IBM 402's and could read 150 cards per minute (250 cards per minute on the IBM 7090). It included a control panel that could be wired to transfer any 72 columns out of the 80 on a card into the computer's memory, though in practice the panel was almost always wired to read the first 72 columns. Cards were read in binary format. Data from each row was read into two 36-bit words, starting with row 9, for a total of 24 words per card. Computer object code could then be executed directly. Conversion to characters or numbers was done in software. The 72 column restriction influenced early computer languages, such as Fortran and Cobol, which only allowed source code in the first 72 columns of each punched card.

The 711 was relatively slow and magnetic tape was much faster, so it was common for 7000 series installations to include an IBM 1401, with its high speed peripherals, to do card-to-tape and tape-to-line-printer operations off-line, with the 711 mainly used for initial program load of operating systems and diagnostics.

Variants of the 711, the IBM 712 and the IBM 714 were used with the IBM 702 and IBM 705 computers.

== In the media ==
- An IBM 711 is shown reading cards as part of an IBM 7090 installation in the 2016 American biographical film Hidden Figures.

== See also ==
- IBM 716 companion line printer
- List of IBM products.
