= IBM 7040 =

IBM mainframe computer, 1960s

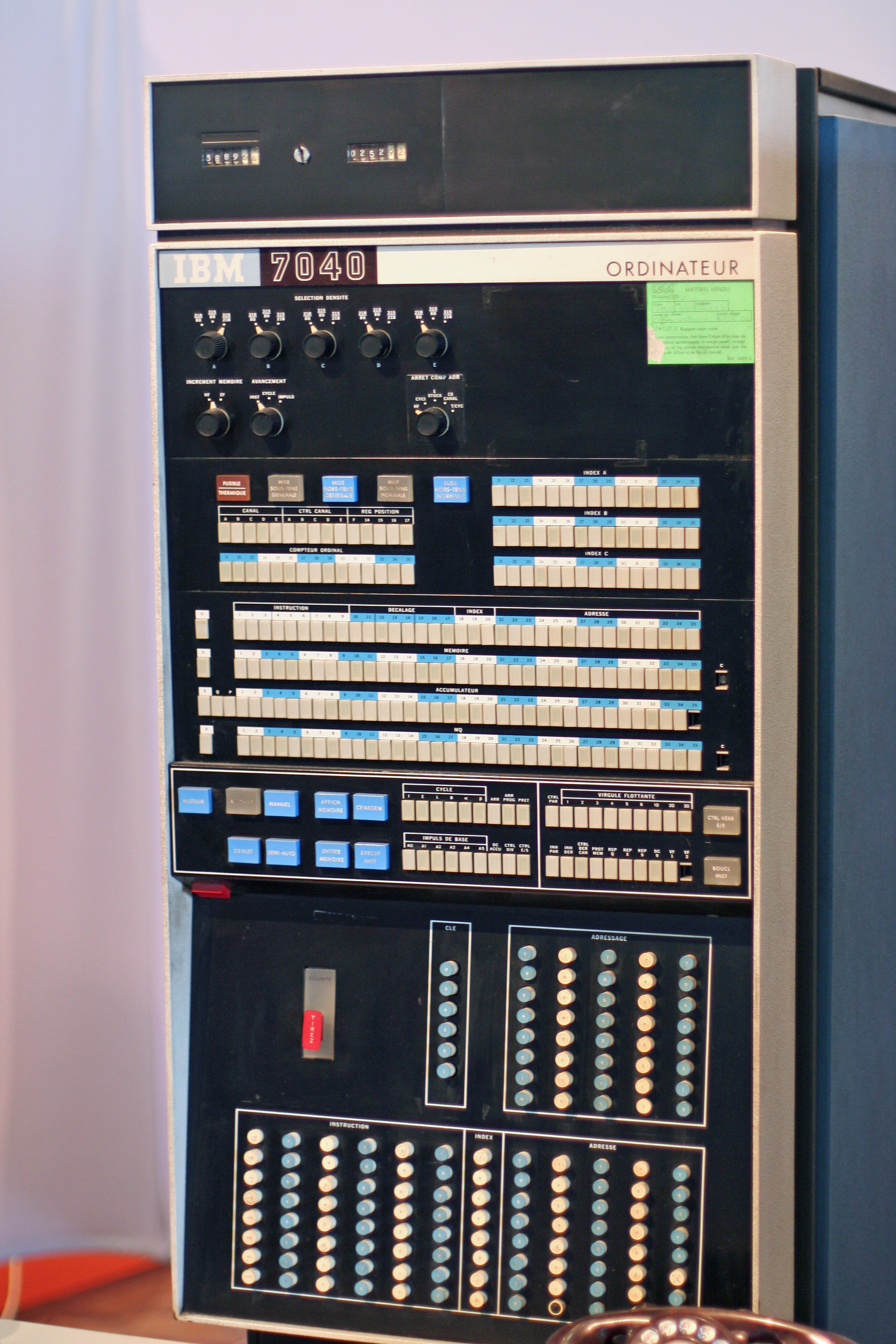
Front panel of an IBM 7040 computer on exhibit at the Musée de l'informatique

The IBM 7040 was a historic but short-lived model of transistor computer built in the 1960s.

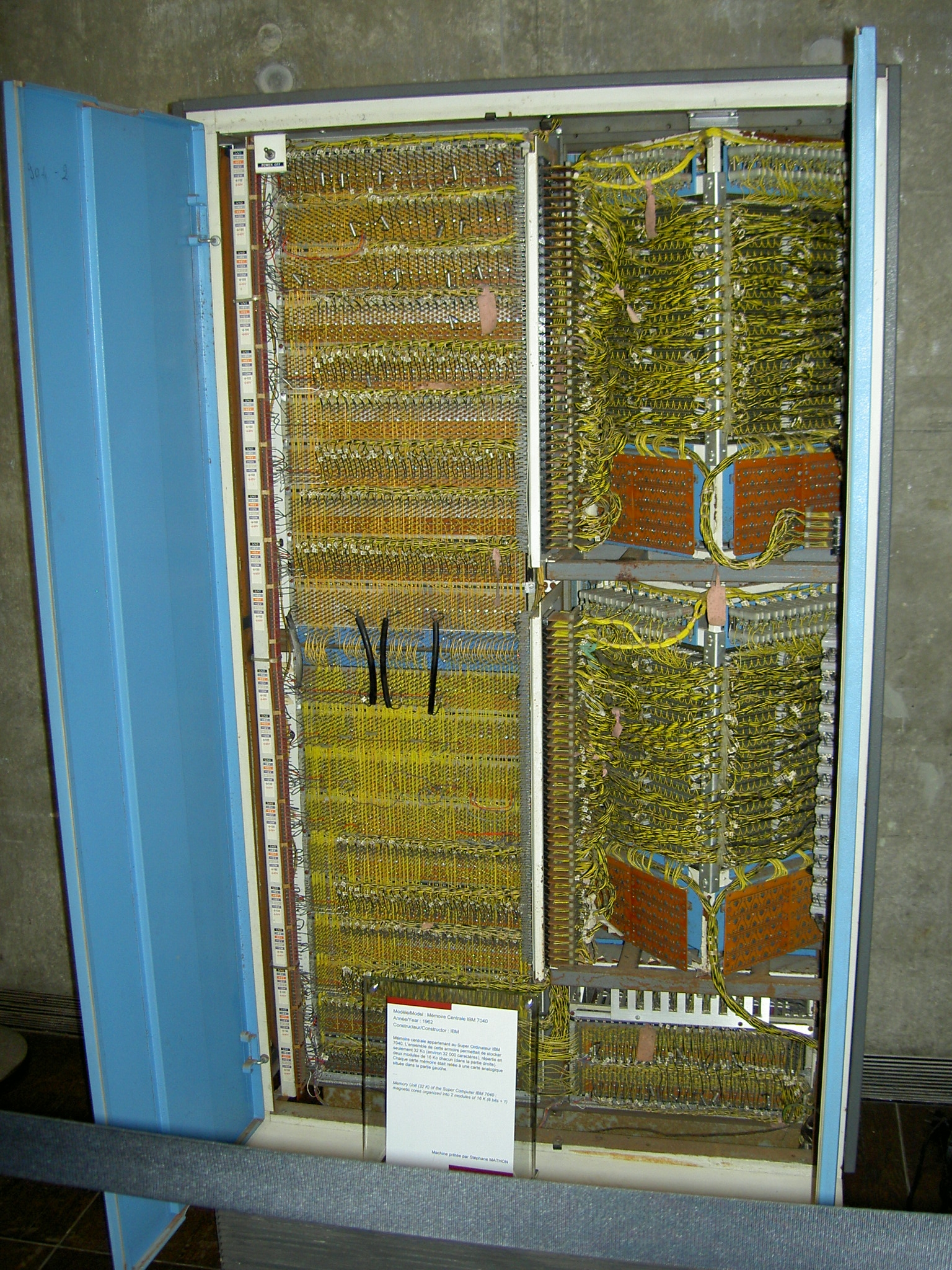
IBM 7040 memory (2 x 16384 words)

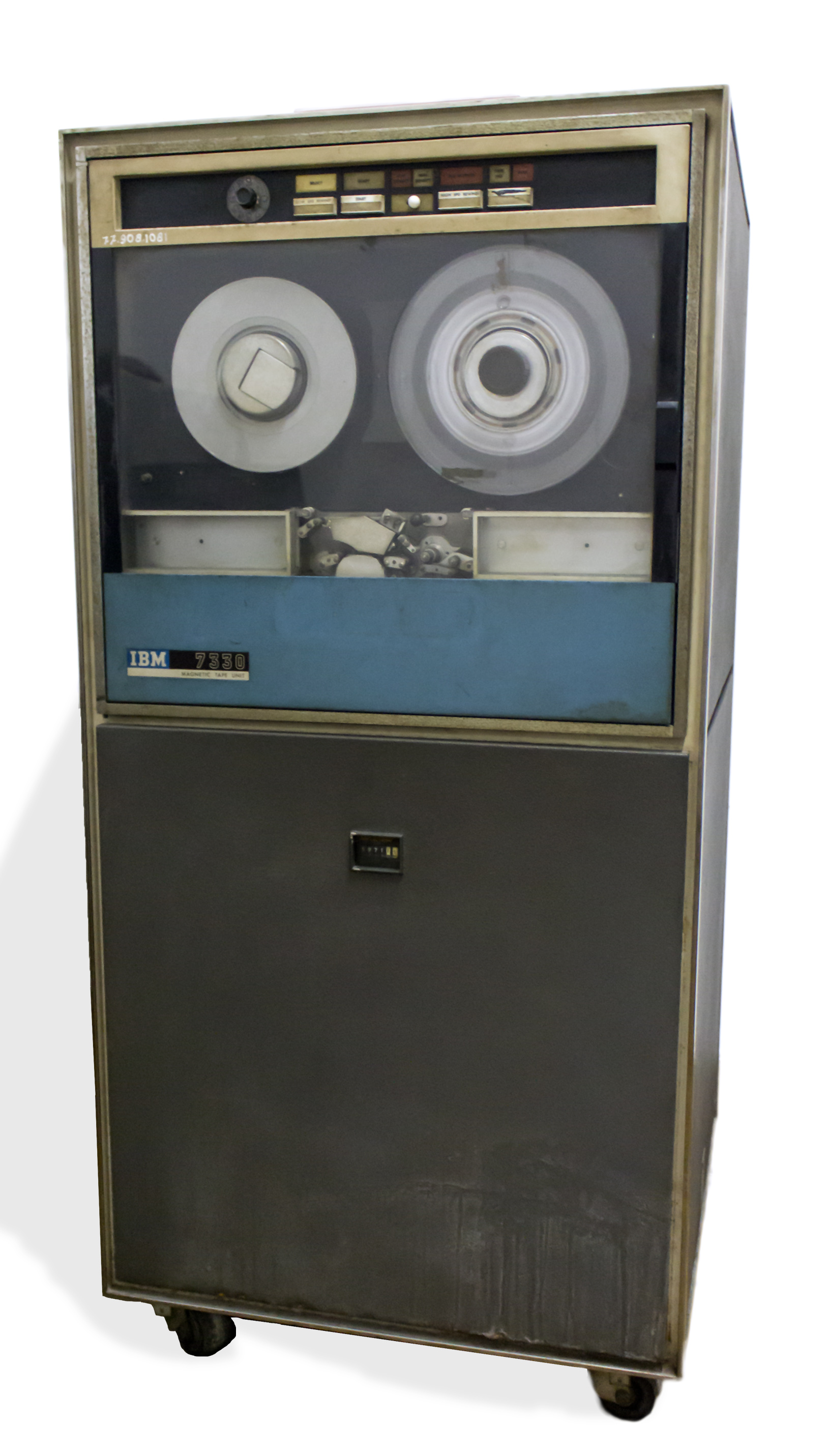
The less-expensive IBM 7330 data tape storage unit was used in many 7040 installations.

== History ==
It was announced by IBM in December 1961, but did not ship until April 1963. A later member of the IBM 700/7000 series of scientific computers, it was a scaled-down version of the IBM 7090. It was not fully compatible with the 7090. Some 7090 features, including index registers, character instructions and floating-point arithmetic, were extra-cost options. It also featured a different input/output architecture, based on the IBM 1414 data synchronizer, allowing more modern IBM peripherals to be used. A model designed to be compatible with the 7040 with more performance was announced as the 7044 at the same time.

Peter Fagg headed the development of the 7040 under executive Bob O. Evans.A number of IBM 7040 and 7044 computers were shipped, but it was eventually made obsolete by the IBM System/360 family, announced in 1964. The schedule delays caused by IBM's multiple incompatible architectures provided motivation for the unified System/360 family.

The 7040 proved popular for use at universities, due to its comparatively low price. For example, one was installed in May 1965 at Columbia University. One of the first in Canada was at the University of Waterloo, bought by professor J. Wesley Graham. A team of students was frustrated with the slow performance of the Fortran compiler. In the summer of 1965 they wrote the WATFOR compiler for their 7040, which became popular with many newly formed computer science departments.

IBM also offered the 7040 (or 7044) as an input-output processor attached to a 7090, in a configuration known as the 7090/7040 Direct Coupled System (DCS). Each computer was slightly modified to be able to interrupt the other.

IBM used similar numbers for a model of its eServer pSeries 690 RS/6000 architecture much later. The 7040-681, for example, was withdrawn in 2005.

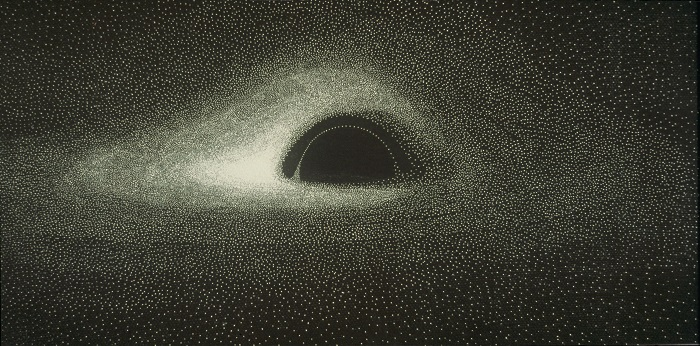
Image of a black hole generated by Luminet using a computer simulation

In 1978, Jean-Pierre Luminet used an IBM 7040 to create the first simulation of a black hole.

== See also ==
- List of IBM products
- IBM mainframe
- History of IBM
