= SHARE Operating System =

- Developer: SHARE user group
- Working state: Discontinued
- Initial release: 1959; 66 years ago
- Available in: English
- Platforms: IBM 709, IBM 7090
- Preceded by: GM-NAA I/O
- Succeeded by: IBM 7090/94 IBSYS

The SHARE Operating System (SOS) is an operating system introduced in 1959 by the SHARE user group. It is an improvement on the General Motors GM-NAA I/O operating system, the first operating system for the IBM 704. The main objective was to improve the sharing of programs.

The SHARE Operating System provided new methods to manage buffers and input/output devices. Like GM-NAA I/O, it allowed execution of programs written in assembly language.

SOS initially ran on the IBM 709 computer and was then ported to its transistorized successor, the IBM 7090.

A series of articles describing innovations in the system appears in the April 1959 Journal of the Association for Computing Machinery.

In 1962, IBM discontinued support for SOS and announced an entirely new (and incompatible) operating system, IBM 7090/94 IBSYS.

== See also ==
- Multiple Console Time Sharing System
- Timeline of operating systems
- SQUOZE
