= IBM 702 =

Early vacuum-tube computer system

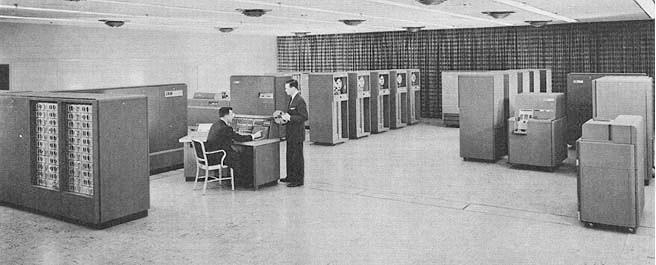
IBM 702 system: From left to right, CRT memory, 702 CPU, 717 printer, operator's console, 757 printer control unit, 752 tape control unit, five 727 tape drives, 732 drum storage, five 727 tape drives, card reader, card punch, and reader/punch control units.

The IBM 702 was an early generation tube-based digital computer produced by IBM in the early to mid-1950s. It was the company's response to Remington Rand's UNIVAC, which was the first mainframe computer to use magnetic tapes. As these machines were aimed at the business market, they lacked the leading-edge computational power of the IBM 701 and ERA 1103, which were favored for scientific computing, weather forecasting, the aircraft industry, and the military and intelligence communities.

Within IBM, the 702 was notable for adapting the new technology of magnetic-core memory for random-access applications.

The 702 was announced September 25, 1953, and withdrawn October 1, 1954, but the first production model was not installed until July 1955. It was superseded by the IBM 705.

== History ==
Fourteen 702s were built. The first one was used at IBM. Due to problems with the Williams tubes, the decision was made to switch to magnetic-core memory instead. The fourteenth 702 was built using magnetic-core memory, and the others were retrofitted with magnetic-core memory.

The successor to the 702 in the 700/7000 series was the IBM 705, which marked the transition to magnetic-core memory.

== Overview ==
The 702 was designed for business data processing. Therefore, the memory of the computer was oriented toward storing characters. The system used electrostatic storage, consisting of 14, 28, 42, 56, or 70 Williams tubes with a capacity of 1000 bits each for the main memory, giving a memory of 2,000 to 10,000 characters of seven bits each (in increments of 2,000 characters), and 14 Williams tubes with a capacity of 512 bits each for the two 512-character accumulators.

A complete system included the following units:

- IBM 702 Central Processing Unit
- IBM 712 Card Reader
- IBM 756 Card Reader Control Unit
- IBM 717 Printer
- IBM 757 Printer Control Unit
- IBM 722 Card Punch
- IBM 758 Card Punch Control Unit
- IBM 727 Magnetic Tape Unit
- IBM 752 Tape Control Unit
- IBM 732 Magnetic Drum Storage Unit

Total weight (depending on configuration): about 24,645 pounds (12.3 short tons; 11.2 t).

== See also ==
- List of vacuum-tube computers
