= IBM 716 =

Early line printer

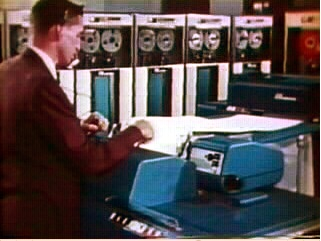
An IBM 716 printer at NASA

The IBM 716 line printer was used with IBM 700/7000 series computers in the 1950s and 1960s. It was introduced on May 21, 1952 with the IBM 701 and withdrawn from marketing on July 14, 1969.

== Overview ==
The 716 was based on IBM 407 accounting machine technology and had 120 rotary type wheels, each with 48 possible characters. It could print 150 lines per minute. It also supplied power to the IBM 711 card reader and 721 card punch. Only 72 characters could be transferred from IBM 7090 computer to the 716 in a single operation, but a full line could be printed at half speed. Characters were printed by sending bit patterns that corresponded to the impulses that a 407 would see when reading a punched card.

A variant of the 716, the IBM 717 was used with the IBM 702 and IBM 705 computers.

== See also ==
- List of IBM products
- IBM 711 companion card reader
