= Computer number format =

Internal representation of numeric values in a digital computer

A computer number format is the internal representation of numeric values in digital device hardware and software, such as in programmable computers and calculators. Numerical values are stored as groupings of bits, such as bytes and words. The encoding between numerical values and bit patterns is chosen for convenience of the operation of the computer; the encoding used by the computer's instruction set generally requires conversion for external use, such as for printing and display. Different types of processors may have different internal representations of numerical values and different conventions are used for integer and real numbers. Most calculations are carried out with number formats that fit into a processor register, but some software systems allow representation of arbitrarily large numbers using multiple words of memory.

== Binary number representation ==
Computers represent data in sets of binary digits. The representation is composed of bits, which in turn are grouped into larger sets such as bytes.

Table 1: Binary to octal
| Binary string | Octal value |
|---|---|
| 000 | 0 |
| 001 | 1 |
| 010 | 2 |
| 011 | 3 |
| 100 | 4 |
| 101 | 5 |
| 110 | 6 |
| 111 | 7 |

Table 2: Number of values for a bit string.
| Length of bit string (b) | Number of possible values (N) |
|---|---|
| 1 | 2 |
| 2 | 4 |
| 3 | 8 |
| 4 | 16 |
| 5 | 32 |
| 6 | 64 |
| 7 | 128 |
| 8 | 256 |
| 9 | 512 |
| 10 | 1024 |
| ... | |
| $b$ | $2^b=N$ |

A bit is a binary digit that represents one of two states. The concept of a bit can be understood as a value of either 1 or 0, on or off, yes or no, true or false, or encoded by a switch or toggle of some kind.

While a single bit, on its own, is able to represent only two values, a string of bits may be used to represent larger values. For example, a string of three bits can represent up to eight distinct values as illustrated in Table 1.

As the number of bits composing a string increases, the number of possible 0 and 1 combinations increases exponentially. A single bit allows only two value-combinations, two bits combined can make four separate values, three bits for eight, and so on, increasing with the formula 2^{n}. The amount of possible combinations doubles with each binary digit added as illustrated in Table 2.

Groupings with a specific number of bits are used to represent varying things and have specific names.

A byte is a bit string containing the number of bits needed to represent a character. On most modern computers, this is an eight bit string. Because the definition of a byte is related to the number of bits composing a character, some older computers have used a different bit length for their byte. In many computer architectures, the byte is the smallest addressable unit, the atom of addressability, say. For example, even though 64-bit processors may address memory sixty-four bits at a time, they may still split that memory into eight-bit pieces. This is called byte-addressable memory. Historically, many CPUs read data in some multiple of eight bits. Because the byte size of eight bits is so common, but the definition is not standardized, the term octet is sometimes used to explicitly describe an eight bit sequence.

A nibble (sometimes nybble), is a number composed of four bits. Being a half-byte, the nibble was named as a play on words. A person may need several nibbles for one bite from something; similarly, a nybble is a part of a byte. Because four bits allow for sixteen values, a nibble is sometimes known as a hexadecimal digit.

== Octal and hexadecimal number display ==
Octal and hexadecimal encoding are convenient ways to represent binary numbers, as used by computers. Computer engineers often need to write out binary quantities, but in practice writing out a binary number such as 1001001101010001 is tedious and prone to errors. Therefore, binary quantities are written in a base-8, or "octal", or, much more commonly, a base-16, "hexadecimal" (hex), number format. In the decimal system, there are 10 digits, 0 through 9, which combine to form numbers. In an octal system, there are only 8 digits, 0 through 7. That is, the value of an octal "10" is the same as a decimal "8", an octal "20" is a decimal "16", and so on. In a hexadecimal system, there are 16 digits, 0 through 9 followed, by convention, with A through F. That is, a hexadecimal "10" is the same as a decimal "16" and a hexadecimal "20" is the same as a decimal "32". An example and comparison of numbers in different bases is described in the chart below.

When typing numbers, formatting characters are used to describe the number system, for example 000_0000B or 0b000_00000 for binary and 0F8H or 0xf8 for hexadecimal numbers.

=== Converting between bases ===
Table 3: Comparison of values in different bases
| Decimal | Binary | Octal | Hexadecimal |
|---|---|---|---|
| 0 | 000000 | 00 | 00 |
| 1 | 000001 | 01 | 01 |
| 2 | 000010 | 02 | 02 |
| 3 | 000011 | 03 | 03 |
| 4 | 000100 | 04 | 04 |
| 5 | 000101 | 05 | 05 |
| 6 | 000110 | 06 | 06 |
| 7 | 000111 | 07 | 07 |
| 8 | 001000 | 10 | 08 |
| 9 | 001001 | 11 | 09 |
| 10 | 001010 | 12 | 0A |
| 11 | 001011 | 13 | 0B |
| 12 | 001100 | 14 | 0C |
| 13 | 001101 | 15 | 0D |
| 14 | 001110 | 16 | 0E |
| 15 | 001111 | 17 | 0F |

Each of these number systems is a positional system, but while decimal weights are powers of 10, the octal weights are powers of 8 and the hexadecimal weights are powers of 16. To convert from hexadecimal or octal to decimal, for each digit one multiplies the value of the digit by the value of its position and then adds the results. For example:

$$\begin{align}
& \text{octal } 756 \\[5pt]
= {} & (7 \times 8^2) + (5 \times 8^1) + (6 \times 8^0) \\[5pt]
= {} & (7 \times 64) + (5 \times 8) + (6 \times 1) \\[5pt]
= {} & 448 + 40 + 6 \\[5pt]
= {} & \text{decimal } 494
\end{align}
\qquad
\begin{align}
& \text{hex } \mathrm{3b2} \\[5pt]
= {} & (3 \times 16^2) + (11 \times 16^1) + (2 \times 16^0) \\[5pt]
= {} & (3 \times 256) + (11 \times 16) + (2 \times 1) \\[5pt]
= {} & 768 + 176 + 2 \\[5pt]
= {} & \text{decimal } 946
\end{align}$$

== Representing fractions in binary ==
=== Fixed-point numbers ===
Fixed-point formatting can be useful to represent fractions in binary.

The number of bits needed for the precision and range desired must be chosen to store the fractional and integer parts of a number. For instance, using a 32-bit format, 16 bits may be used for the integer and 16 for the fraction.

The eight's bit is followed by the four's bit, then the two's bit, then the one's bit. The fractional bits continue the pattern set by the integer bits. The next bit is the half's bit, then the quarter's bit, then the eighth's bit, and so on. For example:

| | | | | integer bits | fractional bits |
|---|---|---|---|---|---|
| 0.500 | = | 1/2 | = | 00000000 00000000.10000000 00000000 |
| 1.250 | = | 1 1/4 | = | 00000000 00000001.01000000 00000000 |
| 7.375 | = | 7 3/8 | = | 00000000 00000111.01100000 00000000 |

This form of encoding cannot represent some values in binary. For example, the fraction 1/5, 0.2 in decimal, the closest approximations would be as follows:

| 13107 / 65536 | = | 00000000 00000000.00110011 00110011 | = | 0.1999969... in decimal |
| 13108 / 65536 | = | 00000000 00000000.00110011 00110100 | = | 0.2000122... in decimal |

Even if more digits are used, an exact representation is impossible. The number 1/3, written in decimal as 0.333333333..., continues indefinitely. If prematurely terminated, the value would not represent 1/3 precisely.

=== Floating-point numbers ===
While both unsigned and signed integers are used in digital systems, even a 32-bit integer is not enough to handle all the range of numbers a calculator can handle, and that's not even including fractions. To approximate the greater range and precision of real numbers, we have to abandon signed integers and fixed-point numbers and go to a "floating-point" format.

In the decimal system, we are familiar with floating-point numbers of the form (scientific notation):

1.1030402 × 10^{5} = 1.1030402 × 100000 = 110304.02

or, more compactly:

1.1030402E5

which means "1.1030402 times 1 followed by 5 zeroes". We have a certain numeric value (1.1030402) known as a "significand", multiplied by a power of 10 (E5, meaning 10^{5} or 100,000), known as an "exponent". If we have a negative exponent, that means the number is multiplied by a 1 that many places to the right of the decimal point. For example:

2.3434E−6 = 2.3434 × 10^{−6} = 2.3434 × 0.000001 = 0.0000023434

The advantage of this scheme is that by using the exponent we can get a much wider range of numbers, even if the number of digits in the significand, or the "numeric precision", is much smaller than the range. Similar binary floating-point formats can be defined for computers. There is a number of such schemes, the most popular has been defined by Institute of Electrical and Electronics Engineers (IEEE). The IEEE 754-2008 standard specification defines a 64 bit floating-point format with:

- an 11-bit binary exponent, using "excess-1023" format. Excess-1023 means the exponent appears as an unsigned binary integer from 0 to 2047; subtracting 1023 gives the actual signed value
- a 52-bit significand, also an unsigned binary number, defining a fractional value with a leading implied "1"
- a sign bit, giving the sign of the number.

With the bits stored in 8 bytes of memory:

| byte 0 | S | x10 | x9 | x8 | x7 | x6 | x5 | x4 |
| byte 1 | x3 | x2 | x1 | x0 | m51 | m50 | m49 | m48 |
| byte 2 | m47 | m46 | m45 | m44 | m43 | m42 | m41 | m40 |
| byte 3 | m39 | m38 | m37 | m36 | m35 | m34 | m33 | m32 |
| byte 4 | m31 | m30 | m29 | m28 | m27 | m26 | m25 | m24 |
| byte 5 | m23 | m22 | m21 | m20 | m19 | m18 | m17 | m16 |
| byte 6 | m15 | m14 | m13 | m12 | m11 | m10 | m9 | m8 |
| byte 7 | m7 | m6 | m5 | m4 | m3 | m2 | m1 | m0 |

where "S" denotes the sign bit, "x" denotes an exponent bit, and "m" denotes a significand bit. Once the bits here have been extracted, they are converted with the computation:

<sign> × (1 + <fractional significand>) × 2^{<exponent> − 1023}

This scheme provides numbers valid out to about 15 decimal digits, with the following range of numbers:

| | maximum | minimum |
|---|---|---|
| positive | 1.797693134862231E+308 | 4.940656458412465E-324 |
| negative | -4.940656458412465E-324 | -1.797693134862231E+308 |

The specification also defines several special values that are not defined numbers, and are known as NaNs, for "Not A Number". These are used by programs to designate invalid operations and the like.

Some programs also use 32-bit floating-point numbers. The most common scheme uses a 23-bit significand with a sign bit, plus an 8-bit exponent in "excess-127" format, giving seven valid decimal digits.

| byte 0 | S | x7 | x6 | x5 | x4 | x3 | x2 | x1 |
| byte 1 | x0 | m22 | m21 | m20 | m19 | m18 | m17 | m16 |
| byte 2 | m15 | m14 | m13 | m12 | m11 | m10 | m9 | m8 |
| byte 3 | m7 | m6 | m5 | m4 | m3 | m2 | m1 | m0 |

The bits are converted to a numeric value with the computation:

<sign> × (1 + <fractional significand>) × 2^{<exponent> − 127}

leading to the following range of numbers:

| | maximum | minimum |
|---|---|---|
| positive | 3.402823E+38 | 2.802597E-45 |
| negative | -2.802597E-45 | -3.402823E+38 |

Such floating-point numbers are known as "reals" or "floats" in general, but with a number of variations:

A 32-bit float value is sometimes called a "real32" or a "single", meaning "single-precision floating-point value".

A 64-bit float is sometimes called a "real64" or a "double", meaning "double-precision floating-point value".

The relation between numbers and bit patterns is chosen for convenience in computer manipulation; eight bytes stored in computer memory may represent a 64-bit real, two 32-bit reals, or four signed or unsigned integers, or some other kind of data that fits into eight bytes. The only difference is how the computer interprets them. If the computer stored four unsigned integers and then read them back from memory as a 64-bit real, it almost always would be a perfectly valid real number, though it would be junk data.

Only a finite range of real numbers can be represented with a given number of bits. Arithmetic operations can overflow or underflow, producing a value too large or too small to be represented.

The representation has a limited precision. For example, only 15 decimal digits can be represented with a 64-bit real. If a very small floating-point number is added to a large one, the result is just the large one. The small number was too small to even show up in 15 or 16 digits of resolution, and the computer effectively discards it. Analyzing the effect of limited precision is a well-studied problem. Estimates of the magnitude of round-off errors and methods to limit their effect on large calculations are part of any large computation project. The precision limit is different from the range limit, as it affects the significand, not the exponent.

The significand is a binary fraction that doesn't necessarily perfectly match a decimal fraction. In many cases a sum of reciprocal powers of 2 does not match a specific decimal fraction, and the results of computations will be slightly off. For example, the decimal fraction "0.1" is equivalent to an infinitely repeating binary fraction: 0.000110011 ...

== Numbers in programming languages ==
Programming in assembly language requires the programmer to keep track of the representation of numbers. Where the processor does not support a required mathematical operation, the programmer must work out a suitable algorithm and instruction sequence to carry out the operation; on some microprocessors, even integer multiplication must be done in software.

High-level programming languages such as Ruby and Python offer an abstract number that may be an expanded type such as rational, bignum, or complex. Mathematical operations are carried out by library routines provided by the implementation of the language. A given mathematical symbol in the source code, by operator overloading, will invoke different object code appropriate to the representation of the numerical type; mathematical operations on any number—whether signed, unsigned, rational, floating-point, fixed-point, integral, or complex—are written exactly the same way.

Some languages, such as REXX and Java, provide decimal floating-points operations, which provide rounding errors of a different form.

== See also ==
- Arbitrary-precision arithmetic
- Binary-coded decimal
- Binary-to-text encoding
- Binary number
- Gray code
- Numeral system
- Unum
- Posit

== Notes and references ==
The initial version of this article was based on a public domain article from Greg Goebel's Vectorsite.
