= CPU modes =

Operating modes for central processing unit

CPU modes (also called processor modes, CPU states, CPU privilege levels and other names) are operating modes for the central processing unit of most computer architectures that place restrictions on the type and scope of operations that can be performed by instructions being executed by the CPU. For example, this design allows an operating system to run with more privileges than application software by running the operating systems and applications in different modes.

Ideally, only highly trusted kernel code is allowed to execute in the unrestricted mode; everything else (including non-supervisory portions of the operating system) runs in a restricted mode and must use a system call (via interrupt) to request the kernel perform on its behalf any operation that could damage or compromise the system, making it impossible for untrusted programs to alter or damage other programs (or the computing system itself). Device drivers are designed to be part of the kernel due to the need for frequent I/O access.

Multiple modes can be implemented, e.g. allowing a hypervisor to run multiple operating system supervisors beneath it, which is the basic design of many virtual machine systems available today.

== Mode types ==
The unrestricted mode is often called kernel mode, but many other designations exist (master mode, supervisor mode, privileged mode, etc.). Restricted modes are usually referred to as user modes, but are also known by many other names (slave mode, problem state, etc.).

Hypervisor
Hypervisor mode is used to support virtualization, allowing the simultaneous operation of multiple operating systems.

Kernel and user
In kernel mode, the CPU may perform any operation allowed by its architecture; any instruction may be executed, any I/O operation initiated, any area of memory accessed, and so on. In the other CPU modes, certain restrictions on CPU operations are enforced by the hardware. Typically, certain instructions are not permitted (especially those—including I/O operations—that could alter the global state of the machine), some memory areas cannot be accessed, etc. User-mode capabilities of the CPU are typically a subset of those available in kernel mode, but in some cases, such as hardware emulation of non-native architectures, they may be significantly different from those available in standard kernel mode.

Some CPU architectures support more modes than those, often with a hierarchy of privileges. These architectures are often said to have ring-based security, wherein the hierarchy of privileges resembles a set of concentric rings, with the kernel mode in the center. Multics hardware was the first significant implementation of ring security, but many other hardware platforms have been designed along similar lines, including the Intel 80286 protected mode, and the IA-64 as well, though it is referred to by a different name in these cases.

Mode protection may extend to resources beyond the CPU hardware itself. Hardware registers track the current operating mode of the CPU, but additional virtual-memory registers, page-table entries, and other data may track mode identifiers for other resources. For example, a CPU may be operating in Ring 0 as indicated by a status word in the CPU itself, but every access to memory may additionally be validated against a separate ring number for the virtual-memory segment targeted by the access, and/or against a ring number for the physical page (if any) being targeted. This has been demonstrated with the PSP handheld system.

Hardware that meets the Popek and Goldberg virtualization requirements makes writing software to efficiently support a virtual machine much simpler. Such a system can run software that "believes" it is running in supervisor mode, but is actually running in user mode.

== Architectures ==
Several computer systems introduced in the 1960s, such as the IBM System/360, DEC PDP-6/PDP-10, the GE-600/Honeywell 6000 series, and the Burroughs B5000 series and B6500 series, support two CPU modes; a mode that grants full privileges to code running in that mode, and a mode that prevents direct access to input/output devices and some other hardware facilities to code running in that mode. The first mode is referred to by names such as supervisor state (System/360), executive mode (PDP-6/PDP-10), master mode (GE-600 series), control mode (B5000 series), and control state (B6500 series). The second mode is referred to by names such as problem state (System/360), user mode (PDP-6/PDP-10), slave mode (GE-600 series), and normal state (B6500 series); there are multiple non-control modes in the B5000 series.

=== RISC-V ===
RISC-V has three main CPU modes: User Mode (U), Supervisor Mode (S), and Machine Mode (M). Virtualization is supported via an orthogonal CSR setting instead of a fourth mode.
