= Gecos =

GECOS or gecos may stand for:

- General Electric Comprehensive Operating Supervisor (GECOS), which was later renamed to General Comprehensive Operating System (GCOS)
- gecos field, an entry in the /etc/passwd file containing personal data about the user on Unix operating systems
