= Advanced Comprehensive Operating System =

Family of mainframe computer operating systems developed by NEC for the Japanese market

Advanced Comprehensive Operating System (ACOS)
- Developer: NEC
- OS family: General Comprehensive Operating System
- Working state: Current
- License: Proprietary
- Official website: jpn.nec.com/products/acosclub/

Advanced Comprehensive Operating System (ACOS) is a family of mainframe computer operating systems developed by NEC for the Japanese market. It consists of three systems, based on the General Comprehensive Operating System family developed by General Electric, Honeywell, and Bull. Two of these systems, ACOS-2 (based on GCOS 4) and ACOS-4 (based on GCOS 7) are still sold, although only ACOS-4 is under active development. ACOS-6 (based on GCOS 8) is an obsolete high-end mainframe platform, which ceased active development in the early 2000s.

The first two models in NEC's SX series of supercomputers, the SX-1 and the SX-2 (released in 1985), ran an operating system derived from ACOS-4, which was variously called either SX-OS or SXCP (SX System Control Program). However, subsequent SX supercomputers, starting with the SX-3 (released in 1990), instead ran a derivative of Unix.

In late September 2012, NEC announced a return from IA-64 to the previous NOAH line of proprietary mainframe processors for ACOS-4, now produced in a quad-core variant on 40 nm, called NOAH-6. ACOS-2 runs on Intel Xeon servers.

In June 2022, i-PX AKATSUKI server equipped with NEC's original processor (NOAH-7) was released.

== See also ==
- Timeline of operating systems
