= Rudd Canaday =

American computer scientist and business executive

- Education: Harvard University (B A., 1959); Massachusetts Institute of Technology (Ph.D., 1964)
- Occupations: Computer scientist, engineer and business executive
- Scientific career
- Workplaces: Bell Telephone Laboratories; Entefy

Rudd Canaday is an American computer systems engineer and a previous member of the technical staff at the Bell Telephone Laboratories in Murray Hill, New Jersey, credited to co-develop the initial design of the Unix file system. In 2015 he joined a Palo Alto based tech startup, Entefy, as a Senior Architect & Engineer.

== Research and career ==
Canaday received his Bachelor of Arts (BA) in Physics from Harvard University in 1959 and received his Doctor of Philosophy (PhD) in Computer Science from Massachusetts Institute of Technology in 1964.

In the 1960s, Ken Thompson developed a game called Space Travel on Multics. Bell Labs left the Multics project in 1969, so Thompson ported the game to FORTRAN for the GECOS operating system. That version was awkward and slow; Thompson found a little-used PDP-7 with a graphics display, and proceeded to write development tools for the PDP-7 and use them to port the game. The development environment was awkward, so Thompson decided to design his own hierarchical file system for the machine, along with Dennis Ritchie, Doug McIlroy and Canaday. He started developing an operating system to use with that file system. Joe Ossanna joined Thompson, Ritchie and Canaday to develop the operating system, called Unics, later named Unix.

In 1973, Canaday along with Evan Ivie started developing the Programmer's Workbench (PWB/UNIX) to support a computer center for a 1000-employee Bell Labs division, which would be the largest Unix site for several years.

=== Selected publications ===
- Canaday, Rudd H.; Harrison, R. D.; Ivie, Evan L.; Ryder, J. L.; Wehr, L. A. (1974). "A back-end computer for data base management". Communications of the ACM. 17 (10): 575–582. doi:10.1145/355620.361172.
- Canaday, Rudd H. (30 November 1965). "Two-dimensional iterative logic". Proceedings of the November 30--December 1, 1965, fall joint computer conference, Part I on XX - AFIPS '65 (Fall, part I). AFIPS '65 (Fall, part I). Las Vegas, Nevada: Association for Computing Machinery. pp. 343–353. doi:10.1145/1463891.1463931. ISBN 978-1-4503-7885-7. S2CID 31075319.

== See also ==
- History of Unix
- PWB/UNIX
