= Honeywell 6000 series =

1970 mainframe computer

Honeywell 6000 Series
- Manufacturer: Honeywell Inc.
- Released: 1970; 56 years ago
- Operating system: GCOS, Multics, CP-6
- Predecessor: GE-600 series

The Honeywell 6000 series computers were a further development (using integrated circuits) of General Electric's 600-series mainframes manufactured by Honeywell International, Inc. from 1970 to 1989. Honeywell acquired the line when it purchased GE's computer division in 1970 and continued to develop them under a variety of names for many years. In 1989, Honeywell sold its computer division to the French company Groupe Bull who continued to market compatible machines.

== Models ==
The high-end model was the 6080, with performance approximately 1 MIPS. Smaller models were the 6070, 6060, 6050, 6040, and 6030. In 1973, a low-end 6025 was introduced. The models with an even number as the next-to-last digit of the model number included an Enhanced Instruction Set feature (EIS), which added decimal arithmetic and storage-to-storage operations to the original word-oriented architecture. In 1973, Honeywell introduced the 6180, a 6000-series machine with addressing modifications to support the Multics operating system.

In 1974, Honeywell introduced several new computers under the name Series 60; the Level 66 and Level 68 members of the series were compatible with the 6000 series machines, and were slightly faster (to 1.2 MIPS) and offered larger MOS memories rather than core memories. The larger machines included a cache memory. The Level 66/20, Level 66/40, Level 66/60, and Level 66/80 were compatible with the 6040, 6060, and 6080; the Level 68/80 was compatible with the 6180, and supported Multics. Lower-end Level 66 and Level 68 processors were introduced in 1975; in the case of the Multics compatible 68/60, the key difference was the removal of the cache memory and limiting the configuration to a maximum of two processors.

In 1977, the line was again renamed to the 66/DPS (68/DPS for Multics compatible models). This was part of wide-scale repricing to remain compatible with the prices reductions that IBM had introduced to the market in early 1977. The newly introduced 68/DPS was available in at least five distinct configurations (Level1 through Level5).

During this period the top of the range was only comparable to the IBM System/370 Model 155/158 when it came to performance; this posed an issue for Honeywell when competing against the higher end of the System/370 family. This led to the development and the introduction of the Honeywell Model 66/85 in 1977. This system built with current-mode logic (CML) which promised to offer faster speeds in a more compact format. However Honeywell were unable to produce the CML chips in a cost-effective manner and subsequently withdrew the 66/85 from marketing in 1978.

In 1979, the family was renamed to DPS-8, again with a small performance improvement to 1.7 MIPS. GCOS 8 shipped as the native operating system with support for a new virtual memory hardware implementation (Virtual Unit - VU) that used a combination of Virtual Spaces, Paging, Segments and Domains. This was known as the "New System Architecture" (NSA) and was incompatible with the Multics model of virtual memory. As a result, modifications were required to ship the Multics compatible DPS-8/M which omitted the VU and instead implemented Multics Ring based securing model and the hybrid "Paged Segmentation" model of Multics virtual memory.

In 1982, Honeywell announced the new DPS-88 model which like the previous unsuccessful 66/85 was built using CML instead of the TTL as used in the previous DPS-8 generation. This required a switch from air cooling to using water cooling. The DPS-88 was offered in at two models based on the number of CPU's supported and memory supported: DPS-88/81 (64MB) and DPS-88/82 (128MB). Subsequently, Honeywell would sign a pact with NEC to import and sell NEC's S-1000 as the DPS-90.

== Hardware ==
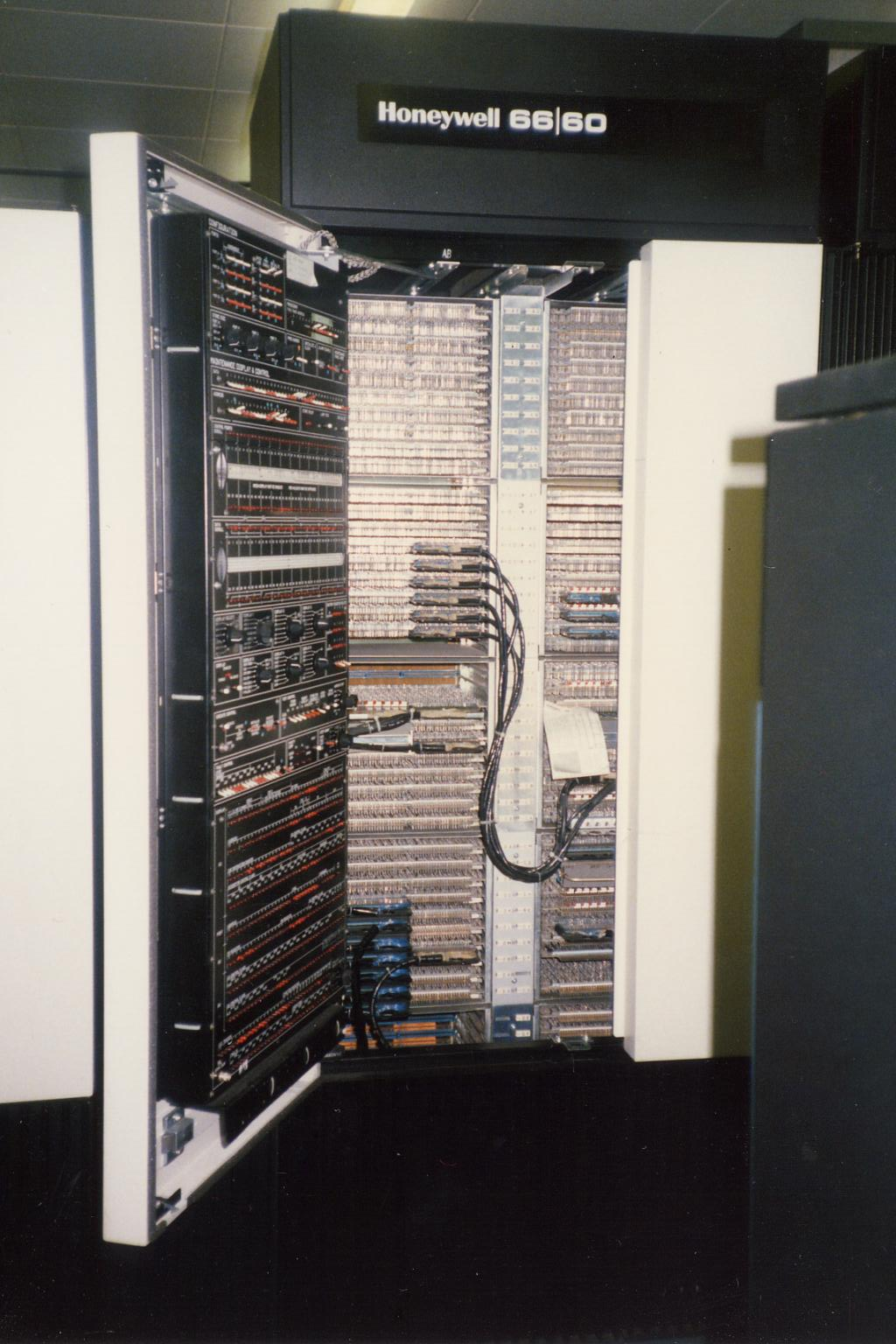
A Honeywell Level 66/60 mainframe computer with its cabinet door open

6000-series systems were said to be "memory oriented" — a system controller in each memory module arbitrated requests from other system components (processors, etc.). Memory modules contained 128 K words of 1.2 μs 36-bit words; a system could support one or two memory modules for a maximum of 256 K words (1 MB of 9-bit bytes). Each module provided two-way interleaved memory.

Devices called Input/Output Multiplexers (IOMs) served as intelligent I/O controllers for communication with most peripherals. The IOM supported two different types of peripheral channels: Common Peripheral Channels could handle data transfer rates up to 650,000 cps; Peripheral Subsystem Interface Channels allowed transfers up to 1.3 million cps.

The 6000 supported multiple processors and IOMs. Each processor and IOM had four ports for connection to memory; each memory module had eight ports for communication with other system components, with an interrupt cell for each port.

Memory protection and relocation was accomplished using a base and bounds register in the processor, the Base Address Register (BAR). The IOM was passed the contents of the BAR for each I/O request, allowing it to use virtual rather than physical addresses.

In the Multics-compatible systems there was an Appending Unit based on the unit of same name in the GE 645. This implemented the Multics model of virtual memory using "Paged Segments". These systems also had a hardware implementation of the Multics protection ring architecture, in contrast to the GE 645 which had emulated protection rings in software. This significantly improved the performance of ring passing events in Multics compared to on the GE 645.

From the DPS-8 generation onwards GCOS could use a competing Virtual Memory architecture that was not compatible with what Multics required from the hardware. That model divided the memory space into 512 Working spaces each of which were further divided into 1024 pages (in DPS-8 implementation) of 4096KB size. On top of this GCOS implemented Segments which could be grouped together in Domains (a Domain could have segments from multiple Working Spaces) which a process could access.

A variety of communications controllers could also be used with the system. The older DATANET-30 and the DATANET 305— intended for smaller systems with up to twelve terminals attached to an IOM. The DATANET 355 processor attached directly to the system controller in a memory module and was capable of supporting up to 200 terminals.

== CPU ==
The CPU operates on 36-bit words, and addresses are 18 bits. The Accumulator Register (AQ) was 72 bits, or could be accessed separately as two 36-bit registers (A and Q) or four 18-bit registers (AU, AL, QU, QL). An eight-bit Exponent Register contained the exponent for floating point operations (the mantissa was in AQ). There were eight eighteen-bit index registers X0 through X7.

The 18-bit Base Address Register (BAR) contains the base address and number of 1024-word blocks assigned to the program (the 6180 used segmentation rather than the BAR). The system also includes several special-purpose registers: an 18-bit Instruction Counter (IC) and a 27-bit Timer Register (TR) with a resolution of 2 μs. Sets of special registers are used for fault detection and debugging.

The EIS instruction set adds eight additional 24-bit registers AR0 through AR7. These registers contain an 18-bit word address, a 2-bit address of a character within the word, and a 4-bit address of a bit within the character.

  Address register format:
                     1 11 2  2
   0                 7 89 0  3
  +-------------------+--+----+
  |      Word         | C| Bit|
  +-------------------+--+----+

=== Instruction formats ===
The 6000-series machine's basic instruction set has more than 185 single-address one-word instructions. The basic instructions are one word; the instruction format is an extension of that of the GE-600 series, with the opcode field extended to 10 bits by adding bit 27 as the low-order bit; that bit is zero in all GE-600 series instructions.

The format for basic and one-word EIS instructions is:

                         1 1         2 2 2 3    3
        0                7 8         7 8 9 0    5
       +------------------+-----------+-+-+------+
       |          Y       |  OP       |I|0| Tag  |
       +------------------+-----------+-+-+------+

- Y is the address field (18 bits).
- OP is the opcode (10 bits).
- I is the interrupt inhibit bit.
- Tag indicates the type of address modification to be performed (6 bits); some tags not supported in the GE-600 series are supported by the 6000 series.

EIS instructions longer than one word are two-word to four-word instructions depending on the specific instruction. The addresses point either to operands or to operand descriptors, which contain the actual operand address and additional information. The format of those instructions is:

                         1 1        2 2 2    3
 word   0                7 8        7 8 9    5
       +------------------+----------+-+------+
   0   |  Variable field  |  OP      |I| MF1  |
       +------------------+----------+-+------+
   1   |Operand descriptor 1 or indirect word |
       +--------------------------------------+
   2   .Operand descriptor 2 or indirect word . (optional)
       +- - - - - - - - - - - - - - - - - - - +
   3   .Operand descriptor 3 or indirect word . (optional)
       +- - - - - - - - - - - - - - - - - - - +

- Variable field contains information relating to the specific instruction (18 bits).
- OP is the EIS opcode (10 bits).
- I is the interrupt inhibit bit.
- MF1 describes the address modification to be performed for descriptor 1 (6 bits). If operands 2 and 3 are present the variable field contains MF2 and MF3.

=== Data formats ===
Data is stored in big-endian format. Bits are numbered starting from 0 (most-significant) to 35 or 71 (least-significant).

- Binary fixed-point data is stored in twos-complement. Half-word (18-bits), word (36-bits) and double-word (72-bits) operands are supported. Multiply and divide instructions are provided which treat the operand as a binary fraction rather than an integer.
- Binary floating-point data can be single precision (36 bits) or double precision (72 bits). In either case the exponent is eight bits, twos-complement binary. The mantissa is either 28 or 64 bits, twos-complement binary.
- Character data is either 6-bit BCD or 9-bit ASCII.

== Peripherals ==
The following peripherals were available for the 6000-Series machines in 1971.

- Control console, attached to the IOM, was a printer-keyboard that operated at 15 characters per second (cps).
- DSS180 removable disk storage subsystem provided up to 18 drives using disks physically compatible with IBM 2316 disks used in the 2314. The disks were formatted to provide 384 six-bit characters per sector and 27,648,000 characters per pack. The average seek time was 34 milliseconds (ms) and data transfer rate was 416,000 cps.
- DSS190 removable disk storage subsystem provided up to 16 drives using disks compatible with the IBM 3336-11 disk packs used in 3330-11 drives. The disks were formatted with variable-length sectors in multiples of 384 characters. One pack could hold up to 133,320,000 characters. The average access time was 30 ms and data transfer rate was 1,074,000 cps.
- DSS270 disk storage subsystem provided up to 20 modules of head-per-track disk. Capacity per module was 15.3 million characters. Average access time was 26 ms, and maximum transfer rate was 333,000 cps.
- DSS167 disk storage subsystem allowed up to eight online disk drives plus an offline spare. Per disk capacity was 15 million characters; average access time was 87.5 ms and data transfer rate was 208,000 cps.
- DSS170 removable disk storage subsystem allowed up to eight online disk drives plus an offline spare. Per disk capacity was 27.5 million characters; average access time was 72.5 ms and data transfer rate was 416,000 cps.
- Magnetic tape was available in a variety of models, all using open-reel ½ inch magnetic tape. Various models could read and write seven-track or nine-track tape with densities from 200 bits per inch (bpi) to 1600 bpi at rates of 37.5 inches per second (ips) to 150 ips. The maximum transfer rate was 266 characters per second (cps). All models connected to the system through the IOM.
- Line printers were the PRT300 train printer capable of printing at 1150 lines per minute (lpm) and the PRT201 at 1200 lpm.
- Punched card equipment consisted of the CRZ201 card reader capable of reading up to 900 80-column cards per minute (cpm) and the CPZ201 card punch which could punch up to 300 80-column cards per minute.

== Software ==
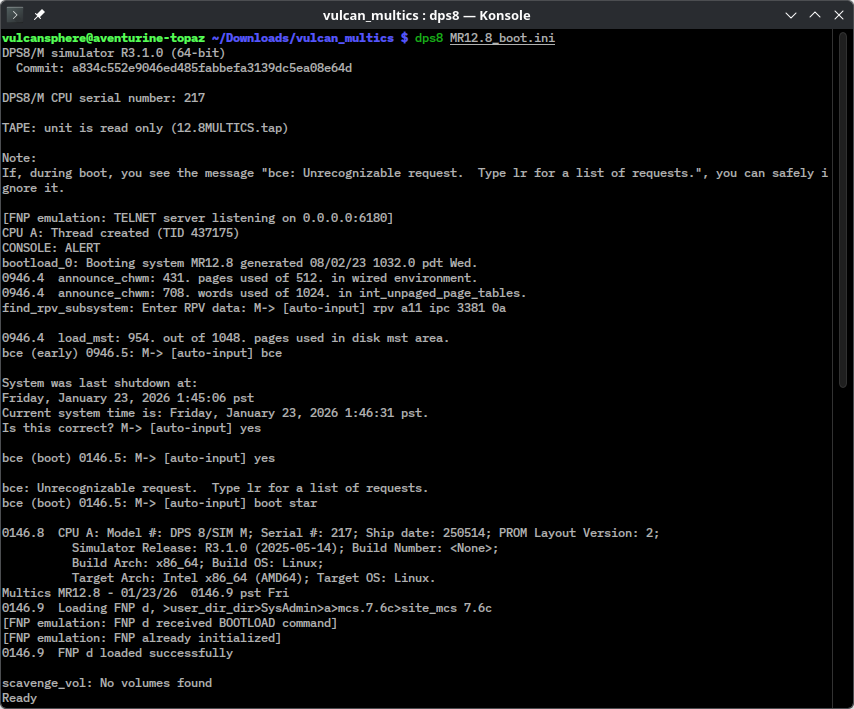
Screenshot of DPS8M emulator

The primary operating system for the line was the General Comprehensive Operating System (GCOS), which Honeywell originally inherited from General Electric's GECOS. In 1978 Honeywell introduced a rewritten version GCOS 8, which supported virtual memory. The Multics OS also ran on selected CPU models.

In 1974, Honeywell purchased Xerox Data Systems (XDS), and developed a work-alike of the Xerox operating system CP-V as CP-6 to run on DPS-8 systems in order to retain Xerox' loyal customer base.

GEIS also ran their custom Mark III operating system on Level 66 and later DPS/8 hardware. This was based on work that GE had originally done with DTSS but with custom GE modifications particularly in the areas of background batch and in File system clustering. GEIS plans to import the NEC ACOS S1000 series was one of reasons why Honeywell would subsequently OEM this as the DPS-90 series.

There is an open source emulator of the line called DPS8M Simulator which can be used to emulate Multics on modern computing platforms.
