= John Couleur =

John Francis Couleur (July 7, 1925, Chicago – August 25, 2007, Scottsdale, Arizona) was an American computer engineer and executive. He was the recipient of over 40 patents.

== Early life ==
During World War II, Couleur enrolled in the V-12 Navy College Training Program. He graduated summa cum laude from Southern Methodist University in Houston, Texas in 1946. During the Korean War, he served as a lieutenant in the United States Air Force.

== Career ==
Couleur joined the General Electric Company. In 1953, at GE's Heavy Military Electronics Department (HMED) in Syracuse, New York, he served as lead architect on the development of the MISTRAM tracking system for the Atlas Missile.

Later at GE, he was responsible for the development of the GE-635 computer system. At the request of MIT Project MAC, Couleur and Ted Glaser designed the modifications to turn the 635 system into what became the GE-645 for the Multics Operating System in 1972.
