= AZUSA =

AZUSA refers to a ground-based radar tracking system installed at Cape Canaveral, Florida and the NASA Kennedy Space Center. AZUSA was named after the southern California town Azusa, California where the system was devised in the early 1950s.

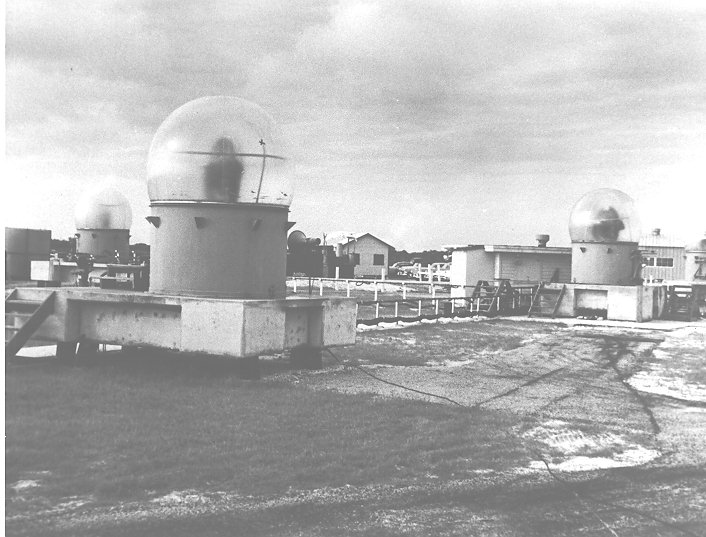
Azusa antenna farm (1954) from US Air Force Eastern Test Range, Florida

== Radar interferometry ==
Radio interferometry yields very accurate tracking angles when a target emits a radio signal. This angular precision of interferometry led to the development of the Azusa tracking system as part of the Army Air Corps NUL-774 Project, forerunner of the Atlas ICBM program, at the Vultee Field Division of Consolidated Vultee Aircraft Corporation (Convair) in Downey, California. Two of the basic patents (2,972,047 and 3,025,520) in the field of interferometer tracking are shared by James W. Crooks Jr., Robert C. Weaver, and Robert V. Werner, all members of the Azusa design team. By the spring of 1948, the Azusa team had built an interferometer operating at 148.58 MHz.

In a strange circle of history, the U.S. Naval Research Laboratory (NRL) was working on underwater sound interferometers at the time Convair was developing Azusa. Since the two groups were in close contact, there was considerable interchange of ideas.* The circle was completed in the early 1950s when the Navy picked up the Azusa interferometer work for its Viking Project at White Sands, New Mexico. The Navy wanted to explore the possibility of converting the Viking or some derivative of it into a guided missile and it needed an accurate guidance system. In an early report from this program, NRL's J. Carl Seddon explained how the Viking would determine its position: "The Missile will detect its position relative to the hyperbolic guidance path by phase comparison of modulation waveforms derived from signals received from two pairs of stations." In this scheme, the missile would guide itself using onboard electronics and navigational signals received from the ground. This seems a far cry from Minitrack and satellite tracking, but phase comparison, the essence of Minitrack, was there.

Within a year, NRL reports from the Viking program were diagramming ground-based tracking interferometers, which relieved the Viking of the burden of signal-processing equipment by computing the missile's position from the ground. Two precursors of Minitrack were evident in the interferometer arrangement. First, only a tiny radio beacon needed to be carried on the Viking itself, an important feature of the Vanguard "Minitrack," in which the prefix 'Mini" applied to the minimum-weight satellite transmitter. The second precursor was the "Lff arrangement of the interferometer antennas which persisted in some early designs of Minitrack, although the final deployed version extended the bars of the "L" to make a cross.

== USAF Atlantic Missile Range, Cape Canaveral, Florida ==
For some scientific satellites "achieving orbit" is enough, but vehicles carrying men or payloads that must be placed in precise positions, such as geosynchronous satellites, require improved trajectory position and velocity measurement systems.

In the early 1960s, the mainstay for obtaining this data at Canaveral was Convair's Azusa Mark I, a c-w cross baseline interferometer operating in the C band, requiring a transponder in the missile. Output data were digitized for use in the IBM 709 computer and measured parameters consist of range, coherent or fine range, and two direction cosines.

The Azusa II, intended to replace Azusa I, was installed in 1961. It is nearly identical to the Mark I except that its circuit design was refined and cosine rate was added which provides better direction cosine information. Both Azusas have identical limitations: they will not track cross-polarized signals; missile antenna nulls deeper than 10 dB cause noisy data, ambiguities and, in severe cases, loss of data.

== Use in Apollo Program ==
The AZUSA tracking radar was used to monitor initial phases of launch for the Saturn S-II by telemetry with transponder frequency of 5,060 MHz (receiver) and 5,000 MHz (transmitter) with 2.5 W of power.

== Robert Weaver ==
Robert Christian Weaver Sr., co-inventor of the AZUSA radar, was a Fresno native, graduated from the University of California Berkeley in 1938 with a bachelor's degree in electrical engineering. He joined the Army Air Corps in 1940, rising to major during World War II. He was responsible for radio and radar equipment in the China-Burma-India Theater. After World War II Weaver began his civilian career with what was then Consolidated Vultee Aircraft in 1946. "After the war he had a choice of engineering jobs; one in Los Angeles, the other in San Diego with Consolidated," his son said. With Convair, Weaver's assignments took him to Cape Canaveral and several other test sites. His specialty became designing radar, guidance and tracking systems for guided missiles and space vehicles. had a career in the aerospace industry that influenced the future of guided missiles and other space vehicles. In the early 1950s, Weaver and a colleague invented the AZUSA continuous wave tracking system, implemented at the Air Force Missile Test Center, Cape Canaveral. This system was designed to measure the trajectory of missiles, and was instrumental in pioneering military missile tests and the Project Mercury crewed space program.The technology that Weaver and his colleague, Jim Crooks, devised flourished during the Cold War. It was applied to the Navy's Polaris Project and the Air Force's Thor, Atlas missiles and Titan Projects. It also was used by NASA in the Saturn IV (Apollo) program. One of the advantages of the Azusa system over its predecessors was that it required fewer radar sites and operating crews. The increased emphasis on ballistic missiles and efforts to improve their accuracy spurred the development of the Azusa system and Mistram, a competing technology developed by GE in the early 1960s.

Choosing the San Diego assignment, Weaver made his home in La Jolla. He was familiar with the area from a 1933 visit to La Jolla Shores, where he had camped out with friends in cow fields, per his son. Computers, electronic gadgets and photography occupied much of his leisure time. He also enjoyed sports cars, as well as "the green flashes of the La Jolla sunsets and the breathtaking beauty of Yosemite Valley," his son said. Weaver, whose engineering career with the Convair Division of General Dynamics spanned 35 years, died age 87 in September 2003 at the White Sands of La Jolla retirement community. He died of natural causes, per his son, Robert Weaver Jr.
