= Groupe Bull =

French computer company

BULL SAS
- Type: State-owned
- Industry: Computer hardware Computer software Consultant; IT Services
- Founded: 1931; 95 years ago
- Headquarters: Les Clayes-sous-Bois, France
- Area served: Worldwide
- Parent: Government of France
- Website: www.bull.com

Bull SAS (also known as Groupe Bull, Bull Information Systems, or simply Bull) is a French computer company headquartered in Les Clayes-sous-Bois, in the western suburbs of Paris. The company has also been known at various times as Bull-General Electric, Honeywell-Bull, CII Honeywell-Bull, and Bull HN. Bull was founded in 1931, as H.W. Egli - Bull, to capitalize on the punched card technology patents of Norwegian engineer Fredrik Rosing Bull (1882–1925). After a reorganization in 1933, with new investors coming in, the name was changed to Compagnie des Machines Bull (CMB). Bull has a worldwide presence in more than 100 countries and is particularly active in the defense, finance, health care, manufacturing, public, and telecommunication sectors.

== History ==
=== Origins ===
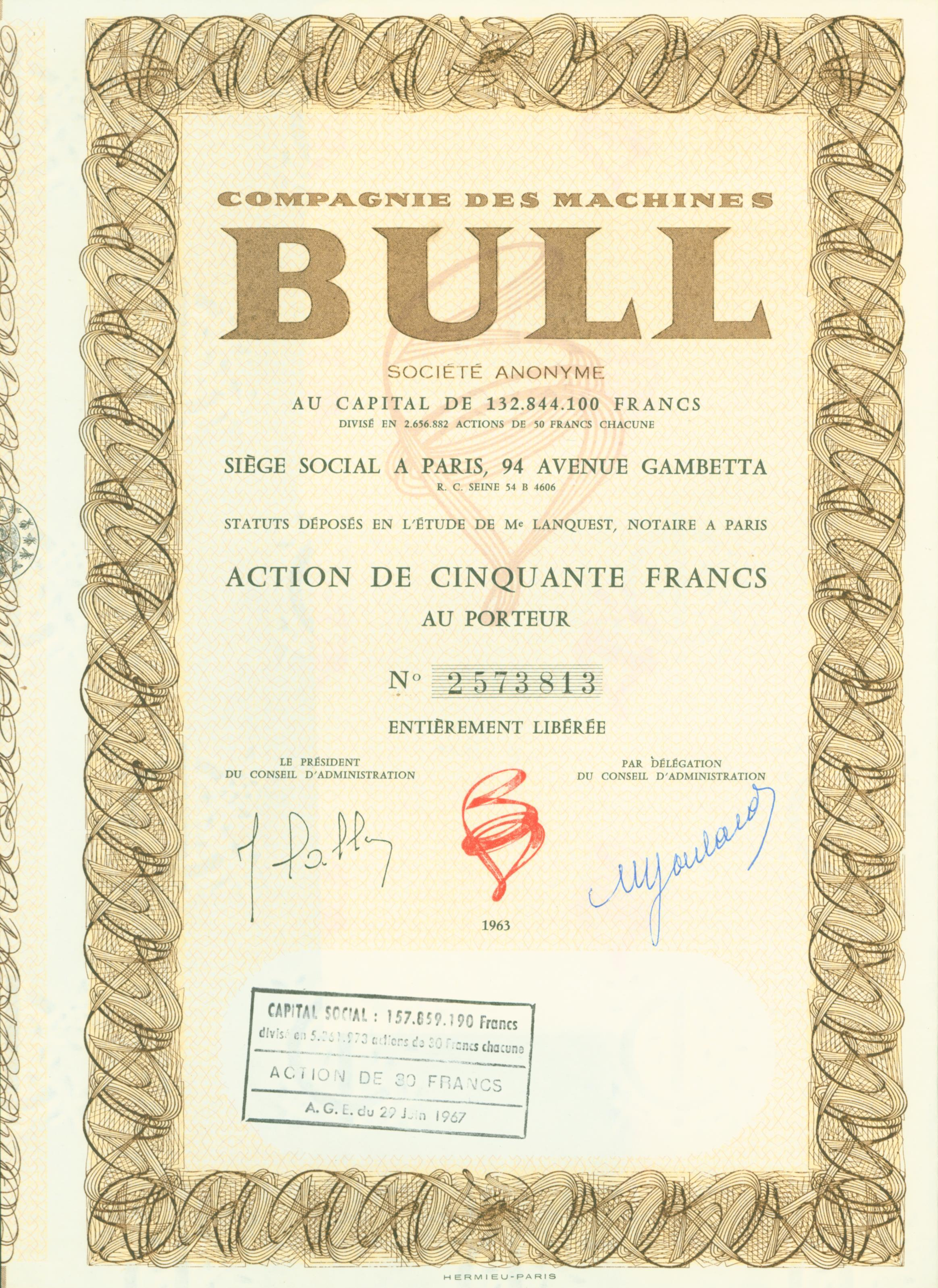
Share of the Compagnie des Machines Bull S. A., issued 1963

On 31 July 1919, Norwegian engineer Fredrik Rosing Bull filed a patent for a "combined sorter-recorder-tabulator of punch cards" machine that he had developed with financing from the Norwegian insurance company Storebrand. Storebrand integrated his device into its operations in 1921. The following year Bull sold his second machine to the Danish insurer Hafnia who had learned of the technology through an article in an insurance trade magazine. At the time of Bull's death from cancer in 1925 at the age of 43, a dozen of his machines had been sold to different companies throughout Europe. The commercial and technical development of the machines continued under the direction of Bull's childhood friend and long-time collaborator Reidar Knutsen along with his brother Kurt Andréas Knutsen.

As the business grew, several outside investors were brought in, leading to the incorporation of the company H.W. Egli Bull in 1931. In 1933, more investors joined and the company changed its name to Compagnie des Machines Bull, a name it would keep until 1964.

A joint venture between Bull and General Electric, Bull-General Electric (Bull-GE), was created in 1964, partly as a means to retain French interests in the burgeoning mainframe market. In 1970, the American company Honeywell Inc. acquired Bull-GE, renaming it Honeywell-Bull which itself merged with Compagnie Internationale de l’Informatique in 1975, becoming CII-Honeywell-Bull. This business was nationalised by the French government in 1982.

The Honeywell-Bull name was used again in 1987 for a joint venture between the nationalised Bull, Honeywell Information Systems, and NEC. The joint venture lasted for two years, before being rebranded once again as Bull HN (Bull-Honeywell-NEC) Information Systems in February 1989 when Bull became the majority shareholder.

In December 1989, Bull bought Zenith Electronics, keeping Zenith Data Systems' headquarters and plants in Chicago and St. Joseph, Michigan, USA. In 1993 the French Government initiated the process of privatization, which was completed in the period 1995-97 when the company was re-privatised.

In August 2014, the French IT company Atos announced that it had acquired a controlling stake in Bull SA through a tender offer launched in May, and it became the Advanced Computing business of that company. Atos announced plans in October, 2014 to buy out or squeeze out the remaining share and bondholders.

In the same year, Bull launched the Hoox m2, the first integrally secured European smartphone, which in June 2014 was approved for use with data classified as "Restricted Information" ("Diffusion Restreinte") by the Agence nationale de la sécurité des systèmes d'information (ANSSI). The Hoox range of secure mobiles and smartphones ensures confidentiality of voice, SMS, e-mail and data communication.

In 2022, Atos announced that the company would be split in two, with Bull becoming part of the consulting and data business called Eviden. However, as attempts to float or sell Eviden have fallen though, it remains part of the parent Atos business, and the Hoox smartphone range now resides with Eviden.

In 2024, the French state confirmed an intent to buy strategic assets from Atos, and on March 31 2026, a deal was completed where Bull was once again owned by the government of France.

== Products and services ==
- Supercomputers
- Escala servers (AIX) and mainframes GCOS (design, manufacturing, distribution)
- Cloud computing infrastructure
- Networking products
- High-performance computing cloud and consulting services
- Modular data centres like BullSequana systems
- SAP S/4HANA and Oracle services

== Amesys controversy ==
Amesys, a Groupe Bull subsidiary specializing in defense and aerospace-related systems and software, became embroiled in controversy in 2011 when it was revealed that it had sold an internet monitoring system to the Muammar Gaddafi regime of Libya in 2007. The Eagle System was used by the Gaddafi regime to spy on citizens and foreign journalists. On 12 March 2013 Reporters Without Borders named Amesys as one of five "Corporate Enemies of the Internet" and "digital era mercenaries" for selling products that have been or are being used by governments to violate human rights and freedom of information. A judicial inquiry was opened by the French government in May 2012 following allegations of complicity in torture by the International Federation for Human Rights (FIDH). In March 2012 Groupe Bull divested itself of the Eagle System, selling it for 4 million euros to Nexa Technologies, a company run by a former Amesys CEO.
