= Associative Programming Language =

The Associative Programming Language (APL) is a database language developed by General Motors Research Laboratories in 1966.

APL was developed to provide high-level language data access and manipulation functions to support GM's CADANCE interactive computer graphics system. It was designed to integrate with PL/I.

The underlying database is assumed to follow the network model. GM's first database manager was implemented via linked lists, but in 1977 the "Virtual Associative Access Manager" {VAAM) was developed to use virtual storage and implementing entity relationships as arrays. APL was later ported to the MCTS operating system.

== Description ==
APL consists of six statements, CREATE, INSERT, FIND, FOR EACH, REMOVE, and DELETE, and miscellaneous functions such as counting the number of members in a set, determining the length or type of an entity, or locating an entity by name.

- Create is a synonym for Allocate. It causes storage to be allocated for a based variable. A file or set where the data is to be allocated may be specified.
- Delete is a synonym for Free. Delete frees a based variable and optionally removes it from all sets of which it is a member.
- Find locates an entity that is a member of a set or container based on specified conditions. An optional ELSE clause is executed if no entities are found.
- For Each heads a group of statements to be executed for all entities or sets matching a specified condition.
- Insert inserts an entity into a specified set. Optionally, the placement of the new entity relative to other elements of the set may be specified.
- Let sets a locator variable to reference a specified set.
- Remove removes an entity from a set.

== Implementation ==
APL statements were initially implemented as PL/I preprocessor macros, which translated into calls to the database manager. Later GM's Apple PL/I dialect supported APL directly in the language.
