= Owen Mock =

American software programmer

Owen R. Mock was a computer software designer and programmer who pioneered computer operating systems in the 1950s. In 1954 Mock was part of a group of programmers at the Los Angeles division of North American Aviation (NAA) who developed the PACT series of compilers for the IBM 701 computer. In December 1955, Mock's group installed in the IBM 701 the "North American 701 Monitor" which was the first operating system to be in operation.

General Motors Research (GMR) also had an IBM 701 and used the compilers developed by Mock's group. When Robert L. Patrick at GMR designed a non-stop multi-user batch processing operating system for use on the next generation computer (IBM 704), Mock's group at NAA and George Ryckman's group at GMR joined forces to develop Robert Patrick's design for the IBM 704. This GM-NAA I/O software was the first operating system for the 704 and began production in 1956.

== Publications ==
- Owen R. Mock, Logical Organization of the PACT I Compiler, J. ACM, vol. 3, No. 4, pages 279-287 (October, 1956).
- Owen R. Mock, The Share 709 System: Input-Output Buffering, J. ACM, vol. 6, No. 2, pages 145-151, (April, 1959).
