= Speedcoding =

High-level programming language

- Paradigm: structured, generic
- Designed by: John Backus
- Developer: John Backus and IBM
- First appeared: 1953; 72 years ago
- Typing discipline: strong, static, manifest

Influenced by
- Assembly language, machine code

Influenced
- Fortran, ALGOL 58, BASIC, C, PL/I, PACT I, MUMPS, Ratfor

Speedcoding, Speedcode or SpeedCo was the first high-level programming language (Note: Meaning symbolic and aimed at natural language expressiveness as opposed to machine or hardware instruction oriented coding.) created for an IBM computer. The language was developed by John W. Backus in 1953 for the IBM 701 to support computation with floating point numbers.

The idea arose from the difficulty of programming the IBM SSEC machine when Backus was hired to calculate astronomical positions in early 1950. The speedcoding system was an interpreter and focused on ease of use at the expense of system resources. It provided pseudo-instructions for common mathematical functions: logarithms, exponentiation, and trigonometric operations. The resident software analyzed pseudo-instructions one by one and called the appropriate subroutine. Speedcoding was also the first implementation of decimal input/output operations. Although it substantially reduced the effort of writing many jobs, the running time of a program that was written with the help of Speedcoding was usually ten to twenty times that of machine code. The interpreter took 310 memory words, about 30% of the memory available on a 701.

== History and development ==
In August 1952, several dozen IBM engineers and IBM 701 customers met in Poughkeepsie, New York to exchange ideas and best practices on programming the new machines in assembly. Several attendees expressed frustration with the slow nature of assembly programming and debugging, and questioned the utility of the 701 in applications where solutions to problems were needed quickly, or when the value of a solution justified the expense of computation time but not the cost of programming and debugging. Attendees likewise complained with issues with "scaling", or the need to religiously track the decimal point in arithmetic operations.

John W. Sheldon, a supervisor of IBM's Technical Computing Bureau attending the meeting, and others felt that an "interpretive" programming system that utilized floating point operations was the best solution to this problem. Sheldon asked John Backus, who had previously worked on a CPC to SSEC code translator, to supervise the creation of a new floating-point interpretive programming language for use internal to IBM. Backus himself had previously expressed interest in improving programming methods, and observed that computing costs were roughly equally split between the cost of computation and cost of programming personnel, and that the additional expense of testing made labor the considerably larger expense. Starting in 1953, Backus and five colleagues designed this new language and named it "Speedcoding", where its use soon spread outside of IBM to customer installations of the 701 system.

== Syntax and semantics ==
Speedcoding programs are organized as a series of instructions, each of which are stored in memory as a single 72-bit data word. An instruction generally consists of two operations (OP_{1} and OP_{2}) and 4 memory addresses. The first operation (OP_{1}) is a mathematical or input/output operation that has 3 associated memory addresses, one or more of which can be modified depending on the nature of the operation. Mathematical operations include basic arithmetic, square root, and trigonometry functions. The logical operations include functionality for reading, writing, skipping, and rewinding magnetic tape, as well as operations for interacting with data stored in drum memory. The second operation (OP_{2}) is a logical operation that has the remaining 1 associated memory address. Logical operations allow instructions to be carried out in a different order from which they are written allowing for implementations of gotos, conditionals, loops, and other advanced behavior.

Reserved Arithmetic and Input/Output Operation Keywords

- ADD
- SUB
- ADDAB
- ABADD
- SUBAB
- ABSUB
- MPY
- NGMPY
- DIV
- NGDIV
- SQRT
- SINE
- ARTAN
- EXP
- LN
- MOVE
- WRTPJ
- WRTPK
- WRTPL
- WRTPM
- RFTPJ
- RFTPL
- RFTPM
- RBTPJ
- RBTPK
- RBTPL
- RBTPM
- SFTPJ
- SFTPK
- SFTPL
- SFTPM
- SBTPJ
- SBTPK
- SBTPL
- SBTPM
- RWTPJ
- RWTPK
- RWTPL
- RWTPM
- EFTPJ
- EFTPK
- EFTPL
- EFTPM
- WRDRP
- WRDRQ
- RFDRP
- RFDRQ
- PRINT
- EJECT
- NOOP

Reserved Logical Keywords

- TR
- TRPL
- TRMN
- TRZ
- SNTRP
- SNTRQ
- TIA
- TIB
- TIC
- TIBC
- TIAC
- TIABC
- TDA
- TDC
- TDAB
- TDBC
- TDAC
- TDABC
- SETRA
- SETRB
- SETRC
- SKRA
- SKRB
- SKRC
- RADDA
- RADDB
- RADDC
- RADDD
- ADDA
- ADDB
- ADDC
- ADDD
- SUBA
- SUBB
- SUBC
- SUBD
- STA
- STB
- STC
- STD
- SKIP
- PRCH
- STCH
- ECHTR

== See also ==
- PACT (compiler)
- Short Code (computer language)
