= PL8 =

PL8 or similar may refer to:

- PL.8, a programming language
- PL-8 (missile), a Chinese missile
- Holbeton, Devon, United Kingdom postcode
- Levasseur PL.8, a French aircraft
- PL 8 Ersatz P.II, a German Parseval airship
- PL8.email, a web platform that sends email messages to vehicle plates
