= KOMPILER =

In computing, the KOMPILER was one of the first language compilation and runtime systems for International Business Machines' IBM 701, the fastest commercial U.S. computer available in 1955.

Information on KOMPILER is listed on page 16 of Volume 2, Number 5 (May 1959) of the Communications of the ACM. Known versions are KOMPILER 2 for IBM 701 and KOMPILER 3 for the IBM 704. KOMPILER was eventually replaced by a Fortran compiler on the IBM 704.

== See also ==
- PACT (compiler)
