= COMMON (user group) =

- Formation: 1960
- Legal status: Association
- Purpose: Education, resources, certification, networking
- Headquarters: Chicago, Illinois
- Region served: Worldwide
- Official language: English
- Board president: Justin Porter
- Main organ: COMMON.CONNECT
- Affiliations: IBM
- Staff: 11
- Website: www.common.org

COMMON is the largest association of users of IBM Power Systems and IBM-compatible technology in the world. Power Systems are midrange computers, a class between mainframes and microcomputers. The users' group is a private, not-for-profit organization that provides education, tools, resources and networking opportunities for IBM i users. Members include users, IBMers, vendors, industry experts, recognized speakers, business leaders, and academics.

== History ==
In 1969, the IBM System/3 became the first of IBM's mid-range computers, following by the System/34 and System/36. The IBM System/38, announced in 1978, was not very successful but its architecture was the basis of the IBM AS/400, released in 1988. There were 250,000 AS/400s installed in businesses at the end of 1994 with a corresponding number of people supporting the operation of those computers.

== Financial problems ==
The Late-2000s recession had a severe effect on COMMON activities. Event attendance, which had increased throughout the 1980s and 1990s, dropped substantially. COMMON began hosting one conference per year and shortened the conference length from five days to four. Free attendance for volunteers was also eliminated and sponsorship was required for social events.

== Current status ==
In the 2020s, over 100,000 organizations used mid-range computers. Following a hiatus from COVID, bi-annual conferences resumed, as did additional educational offerings. As of 2021, there were over 26,000 members in LinkedIn's group for AS/400 and iSeries professionals.

IBM makes new product announcements at Common events where users can ask IBM developers questions.

== Member resources ==
Only members can utilize Common resources. Memberships can be acquired by individuals, company or user groups.

A popular feature of membership is the Common Conference, held twice a year at varying locations in the US. The spring conference is named "POWERUp"; the fall conference is named "NAViGATE". Nearly nine hours of educational sessions are scheduled each day; an exhibition expo is open on the second and third day, with about 40 vendors including IBM, offering software and hardware.

Common schedules internet-based education, including Webcasts and Webinars. A Career Center for employers and job hunters.

COMMON and IBM have a program New 2 IBM i (N2i) is a partnership mentoring program between COMMON and IBM for IBM i.

== Events ==
- POWERUp 2024, Fort Worth, May 20–23, 2024
- NAViGATE 2024, Bonita Springs, November 4–6, 2024
- COMMON India, Pune, February 24–26, 2025
- POWERUp 2025, Anaheim, May 19–22, 2025
- NAViGATE 2025, Pittsburgh, September 15–17, 2025

== Local user groups ==
- OCEAN User Group
- The Omni User -- Chicago, IL
- Fairfield AS/400 User Group
- North East User Group
- South East Michigan iSeries User Group
- Central Texas IBM i User Group (CTXiUG)
- International Db2 Users Group
- The Large User Group

== See also ==
- SHARE (computing)
- GUIDE International
