= Allen-Babcock =

Allen-Babcock Computing was founded in Los Angeles in 1964 by James D. Babcock and Michael Jane Allen Babcock to take advantage of the fast-growing market for computer time-sharing services.

In 1966 the company developed "RUSH" (Remote Users of Shared Hardware), an interactive dialect of PL/I. Between 1965 and 1966 they assisted in the development of Conversational Programming System (CPS), a timesharing system that ran under OS/360, under contract to IBM. CPS was a subset of RUSH prepared by IBM with the permission of Allen-Babcock.

The significant technological outcome was the first idea to alter the hardware of an IBM computer to enhance the performance of a time-sharing system on IBM hardware. This was the first time such firmware was programmed by software developers for this purpose. Later tests showed increases of throughput by as much as 70%. Several such altered System/360 Model 50s were delivered to other IBM customers.

In 1969 Allen-Babcock held a 3 percent share of the time-sharing services market.

During the early 70's Allen-Babcock leased copies of the RUSH software to several industry owners of the IBM 360 series computer systems. One such company was Procter & Gamble. These lessees sought to use RUSH internally to provide their companies access to time sharing on their internal networks.

In 1975 Allen-Babcock was acquired by Tymshare.
