= Multiple Console Time Sharing System =

GM Multiple Console Time Sharing System (MCTS)
- Developer: General Motors Research Laboratories
- OS family: Multics
- Working state: Historic
- Initial release: 1970s
- Available in: English
- Platforms: Control Data Corporation STAR-100
- Kernel type: N/A
- Default user interface: Command-line interface
- License: none

The Multiple Console Time Sharing System (MCTS) was an operating system developed by General Motors Research Laboratories in the 1970s for the Control Data Corporation STAR-100 supercomputer. MCTS was built to support GM's computer-aided design (CAD) applications.

MCTS was designed starting in 1968. It was written in a high-level systems programming language "Malus", a dialect of PL/I. A superset of Malus called Apple became the primary application language.

MCTS was based on Multics. All access to data was through the virtual memory system. Only the system paging support module was concerned about the physical location of the data.

== See also ==
- GM-NAA I/O
- SHARE Operating System
- Timeline of operating systems
