= SabreTalk =

SabreTalk is a discontinued dialect of PL/I for the S/360 IBM mainframes running the TPF platform. SabreTalk was developed jointly by American Airlines, Eastern Air Lines and IBM. It is known as PL/TPF (Programming Language for TPF).

In 1973, Eastern Air Lines' computing division was selling the SabreTalk compiler for US$95,000.

SabreTalk programs still run in the British Airways Flight Operations system (FICO) under ALCS, using a commercially available automatic converter to translate SabreTalk programs to C programs. Both the Reservations and Operations Support System (OSS) of Delta Air Lines were developed using both SabreTalk and IBM 360 Assembler. Although development is currently restricted to C++, the majority of Delta's programming platform remained in Sabretalk until recently in the 2010s.

Because of the availability of translators from SabreTalk to C and discontinued support by the original developers, several companies are beginning the move away from SabreTalk to purely C-based programs.

Code Sample:

 SAMPLE: PROCEDURE;
       DECLARE ARRAY(10) DECIMAL(5) BASED(POINTUR);
       DECLARE COUNTER BINARY(15) ALIGNED;
       DECLARE TOTAL BINARY(31) ALIGNED;
       START(POINTUR=#RG1);                  /* RECEIVE POINTER TO ARRAY IN REGISTER 1 */
       TOTAL = 0;
 LOOP: 
       DO COUNTER = 0 TO 10 BY 2;
         TOTAL = TOTAL + ARRAY(COUNTER);     /* TALLY EVEN NUMBERED ITEMS */
       END LOOP;
       IF TOTAL = 0 THEN                     /* VALUE OF TOTAL COMPUTED? */ 
          ENTRC ERRO;                        /* N=CHECK VALIDITY IN PROG ERRO W/RETURN EXPECTED*/
       BACKC(#RAC= TOTAL);                   /* BACK TO CALLING PROGRAM PASSING VALUE OF       */
 END SAMPLE;                                 /*  TOTAL IN REGISTER RAC.                        */
