= Apple (programming language) =

PL/I dialect programming language

Apple is a PL/I dialect programming language created by General Motors Research Laboratories for their Control Data Corporation STAR-100 supercomputer.

Apple is a subset of full PL/I, but has been extended to integrate with the Associative Programming Language (APL – not to be confused with APL (programming language) )

== Associative programming features ==
	Data types
Entity	"The ENTITY attribute specifies a variable that may be manipulated by the INSERT, REMOVE, FIND, and FOR EACH statements."
Set	"The SET attribute defines the name of a data aggregate that represents an ordered set of entity variables."
File_Set	A File_Set is a SET that is contained in an external file.

	Statements
Create	Create is a synonym for Allocate. It causes storage to be allocated for a based variable. A file or set where the data is to be allocated may be specified.
Delete	Delete is a synonym for Free. Delete frees a based variable and optionally removes it from all sets of which it is a member.
Find	Locate an entity that is a member of a set or container based on specified conditions. An optional ELSE clause is executed if no entities are found.
For Each	Heads a group of statements to be executed for all entities or sets matching a specified condition.
Insert	Insert an entity into a specified set. Optionally, the placement of the new entity relative to other elements of the set may be specified.
Let	Set a locator variable to reference a specified set.
Remove	Remove an entity from a set.

	Builtin function
ALL	performs various operations on all members of a set, depending on the context in which it appears.
APLESET	returns a value indicating whether or not a file-set has been created.
APLEVAR	returns a pointer to the entity containing the set specified by its argument, or NULL if the set is a file-set.
APLINDX
APLNUMB
APLOWNI
APLOWRS
APLSNAM
APLTYPE

== Other features ==
An OFFSET variable identifies the relative location of a based variable in the containing file. A DESCRIPTOR variable resembles a pointer variable, but also contains the length of the associated based variable in addition to its address.

The LOCK statement puts a program into "locked status", where all asynchronous events will be queued. A corresponding UNLOCK statement puts the program in "unlocked status", capable of processing asynchronous events. All queued events will be processed.

=== Asynchronous processing ===
Apple uses the PL/I EVENT data type to implement asynchronous processing.

An event variable can be associated with an external action, such as a keypress at the user's terminal, by a system call. Each event has a "delay state" and a "completion state" associated with it. When the event associated with the action occurs, the event becomes complete, and remains complete until the program accesses the information associated with the event. Events can also be marked complete with a SIGNAL statement, rather than the PL/I standard assignment to theCOMPLETION pseudovariable. An event can be put into a delay state by the DELAY pseudovariable, and recognition will remain deferred until the program resets the delay state.

Events can be associated with "ON-Units", by the ON EVENT statement, similar to PL/I standard for conditions. The REVERT statement removes the association. When the event is recognized (complete and not delayed) the On-Unit is executed. This ON-Unit can access system information about the event using the ONPTR builtin function, which returns the address of an "Event Completion Block", and sets the event to complete.

=== Hardware access ===
The REGISTER storage class and the INLINE builtin subroutine allow access to STAR hardware features.

A scalar arithmetic variable can be declared REGISTER [register-specification]. register-specification can be an unsigned integer constant 0..255 to specify one of the computer's hardware registers. If it is omitted the compiler will assign a register.

The INLINE builtin subroutine inserts an arbitrary machine-language instruction into the compiled code. Except for the function code (operation code) and subcode of the instructions all operands can be numeric constants, variables, or arithmetic constants.

Example:

 CALL INLINE("F8", 5, 0, SOURCE, 0, "20", 0, TARGET);

=== Text replacement ===
The LITERALLY specification allows the programmer to specify replacement text to be substituted at compile time. The syntax is:

 %DECLARE <identifier> LITERALLY [ (<parameter-list> ) ] <character-constant> ;

If <parameter-list> is not specified the compiler replaces all occurrences of <identifier> throughout the program with <character-constant>.If <parameter-list> is specified, the replacement character string is formed by replacing all occurrences of the parameter name with the corresponding argument.

Example:

 %DECLARE BITS LITERALLY(A1,A2) 'A1*A2*64';
 I = BITS(J,B);

will generate the statement:

 I=J*8*64;

== Omitted PL/I features ==
Some features of standard PL/I are not included in Apple. The most significant are:

- The CONTROLLED and AREA storage attributes are not supported. FILE and FILESET have many of the characteristics of AREA.
- List-directed and data-directed input and output are not supported.
- Record input-output statements, including READ, WRITE, REWRITE, LOCATE, and DELETE. DELETE is used as a synonym for FREE when deleting ENTITY variables.
