= GM-NAA I/O =

Early operating system for IBM 704

- Developer: General Motors, North American Aviation
- Working state: Discontinued
- Initial release: 1956; 70 years ago
- Marketing target: Batch processing
- Available in: English
- Supported platforms: IBM 704
- License: Proprietary
- Preceded by: General Motors Operating System

The GM-NAA I/O input/output system of General Motors and North American Aviation was the first operating system for the IBM 704 computer.

It was created in 1956 by Robert L. Patrick of General Motors Research and Owen Mock of North American Aviation. It was based on a system monitor created in 1955 by programmers of General Motors for its IBM 701. Patrick made Gantt charts which were already used in those days by GM for automotive production line design on how to make parallel processes fit together.

The main function of GM-NAA I/O was to automatically execute a new program once the one that was being executed had finished (batch processing). It was formed of shared routines to the programs that provided common access to the input/output devices. Some version of the system was used in about forty 704 installations.

== See also ==
- SHARE Operating System, an operating system based on GM-NAA I/O.
- Multiple Console Time Sharing System
- Timeline of operating systems
- Resident monitor
