= PL-6 =

Programming language

- Paradigm: procedural
- Designed by: Honeywell, Inc.
- OS: Honeywell CP-6

Influenced by
- PL/I

PL-6 is a discontinued system programming language based on PL/I. PL-6 was developed by Honeywell, Inc. in the late 1970s as part of the project to develop the CP-6 operating system, a follow-on to Xerox CP-V to run on Honeywell Series 60 and DPS-8 systems.

== Description ==
=== Data types ===
Declaration attribute	Description
SBIN(n)	Signed binary integer of n bits. If (n) is not specified, 36 bits is the default. Alternatively "SBIN WORD", "SBIN HALF", or "SBIN BYTE" specifies 36, 18, or 9 bits respectively.
UBIN(n)	Unsigned binary integer of n bits. Otherwise the same as SBIN.
CHAR(c)	Fixed-length character string of length c characters.
BIT(b)	Fixed-length bit string of length b bits.
PTR	A memory address.

PL-6 has no provision for floating point data.

=== Aggregates ===
Arrays are one dimensional and zero-based, with the zero specified explicitly. For example, DCL x (0:4) SBIN; declares an array of five signed 36-bit integers. The elements are numbered x(0), x(1),...,x(4).

Structures are also supported. For example:

DCL 1 struct,
      2 a,
        3 b CHAR(3),
        3 * CHAR(1),
      2 c CHAR(4);

declares a structure named struct consisting to two elements: a minor structure a consisting of a three-character field b and an unnamed one-character element ("*" indicates the element is unnamed), and a four-character element c.

The top level of the structure must be 1, and the remaining levels 2–10, if used, have to be specified in order with no levels skipped.
