= Digigraphics =

Digigraphics was one of the first graphical computer aided design systems to go on sale. Originally developed at Itek on the PDP-1 as EDM (Electronic Drafting Machine), the efforts were purchased by Control Data Corporation and ported to their machines, along with a new graphics terminal to support it. Systems cost almost $500,000 and supported only a few users at a time, so in spite of a number of advantages it was not cost competitive with traditional manual methods and only a few systems were sold.

== History ==
=== Genesis at Itek ===
MIT's Lincoln Laboratory developed the first high-speed computer in the form of Whirlwind, as part of the US Air Force's SAGE project. SAGE not only required high-speed computers, but also graphical displays and light pens to operate them in real-time. The ideas developed during the SAGE program "leaked out" into the industry as SAGE wound down and its many members moved on to other projects. Ken Olsen formed Digital Equipment Corporation (DEC) and took many of the early SAGE programmers with them, Jack Gilmore and Charles Adams started Charles W. Adams Associates, one of the first programming companies, and Norm Taylor went to work at Itek, who was attempting to build a computerized machine for retrieving photographs from a large library.

In 1959 Gilmore at Adams met with Taylor at Itek and proposed the idea of jointly developing a computer system for engineering design. Taylor convinced Itek's management to fund development, finally receiving the go-ahead in August 1960, retaining Adams Associates to write the software The natural choice for the host computer was DEC's newly released PDP-1. The PDP-1 had many of the same features as the earlier Lincoln Lab machines, including an optional vector display and light pen support. The PDP-1 was based on an 18-bit word (1/2 the common mainframe 36-bits), had a 4,000-word core memory, and ran at about 0.1 MIPS.

Between mid-1960 and June 1961, the basic hardware was assembled, initially at Digital's facility in Maynard, and later at Itek. Itek's PDP-1 was the second one to be delivered to a customer, the first being to MIT's Project MAC. A new 25 inch tube was used, larger than the PDP-1's standard 16 inch Type 30, but packaged in a similar hexagonal case. Input was via a combination of light pen for pointing, and the PDP-1's front panel switches for commands. An overlay was used on the front panel to indicate the special functions, and another on the display for labeling outputs.

Normally the PDP-1 display was driven in software, so as the complexity of the drawings increased, performance decreased. Itek addressed this problem by developing a "display processor" that would offload the task of refreshing the screen so the computer could be used solely for processing. Vector information was stored on the outer tracks of a 36 inch hard disk supplied by Telex. Storing data only on the outside meant the linear speed was higher, providing faster throughput and allowing the system to generate 30 images a second from the data. Vectors were stored with 4-bit points to increase performance. In total, the disk system stored about 500,000 18-bit words, with about 20,000 bytes of vector data being used.

=== On the market ===
The basic system was assembled and operational by early 1962, when Itek started actively marketing it as EDM. The system developed intense interest, and was even featured in a Time magazine article:

The operator's designs pass through the console into an inexpensive computer, which solves the problems and stores the answers in its memory banks in both digitalized form and on microfilm. By simply pressing buttons and sketching with the light pen, the engineer may enter into a running dialogue with an EDM, recall any of his earlier drawings to the screen in a millisecond and alter its lines and curves at will.

The US Air Force purchased one system for use at the Lincoln Labs on the PDP-1 that drove their Experimental Dynamic Processor, or DX-1. This version used a magnetic drum in place of the disk, its increased performance allowing more data to be stored before performance became an issue. This version used 6-bit words for locations instead of the prototype's 4-bit words, increasing resolution and allowing support for 2,000 inch documents instead of 800.

EDM was not the only CAD system being developed at the time. General Motors started developing a similar system in 1959, and IBM joined the effort in 1960. In spite of starting at about the same time, Digigraphics beat their DAC-1 to market by the better part of a year.

=== Sale to Control Data ===
EDM was pitched to Itek while its president Richard Leghorn was in the midst of a buying spree. The company was publicly involved in the computer industry (its name was phonetically shortened from "information technology") but in reality supplied a single product, the cameras for the CIA's CORONA spy satellites. As a number of the company's acquisitions failed, Leghorn was removed from control of the company in May 1962 and replaced by Franklin Lindsay. Lindsay quickly shed most of Leghorn's acquisitions, including EDM.

The system was picked up by Control Data Corporation (CDC), who were in the process of introducing a number of computer systems. Adams Associates won a contract to port the system to the CDC 3200 while CDC created a new version of the terminal, the CDC 274, controlled by the new CDC 1700 computer. Versions of the basic system were later ported to other CDC computers, including the 6000 family, which could support several 274's on a single machine.

Over the next few years CDC sold a small number of the Digigraphics systems, first to aerospace companies including Lockheed and Martin Marietta, and later to the US Navy, for use in submarine design. After several years, CDC decided the concept was unprofitable, and closed the division.

== See also ==
- DAC-1
