= UniPrise Systems =

UniPrise Systems, Inc.
- Type: Private
- Industry: Software
- Founded: November 1993; 33 years ago in Irvine, California
- Founders: Joseph Perry; Randy Knapp; Robert Mowry
- Defunct: 1998; 28 years ago
- Fate: Dissolution

UniPrise Systems, Inc. was a privately held software company with its headquarters in Irvine, California. The company was founded in November 1993 by Joseph Perry, Randy Knapp, and Robert Mowry. Software development, engineering and technical support were located in North Chelmsford, Massachusetts.

UniPrise specialized in compilers and database products for the Unix environment. In 1997 they signed an agreement with Hewlett-Packard corporation to bundle their database monitoring software with HP OpenView systems management software. As of 1998 products included:

- IMPERA – a management tool for distributed database systems.
- Access/DAL – database access middleware.
- UniPrise PL/I for UNIX.
- PL/I for OpenVMS

The company abruptly went out of business in 1998. Seventeen employees filed a lawsuit against the company's chairmen the following year, citing unpaid wages, business expenses, and benefits. The case was settled in 2001.
