= Honeywell CP-6 =

CP-6
- Developer: Honeywell, Inc.
- Written in: PL-6
- OS family: Universal Time-Sharing System
- Working state: Historic, discontinued 2005
- Source model: Closed source
- Initial release: Beta 1979
- Marketing target: Former XDS Sigma CP-V customers
- Supported platforms: Honeywell Level/66 and successors
- Default user interface: Command-line interface
- License: Proprietary

CP-6 is a discontinued computer operating system, developed by Honeywell, Inc. in 1976, which was a backward-compatible work-alike of the Xerox CP-V, fully rewritten for Honeywell Level/66 hardware. CP-6 was a command line oriented system. A terminal emulator allowed use of PCs as CP-6 terminals.

== History ==
In 1975, Xerox decided to sell the computer business which it had purchased from Scientific Data Systems in 1969. In a deal put together by Harry Sweatt, Honeywell purchased Xerox Data Systems, and took on the Xerox sales and field computer support staff to provide field service support to the existing customer base. Xerox made available all the spare equipment and supplies and the warehouses containing them. Revenues were shared 60/40 Xerox until CP-6 General Release, and 60/40 Honeywell for three years thereafter. Following that, all revenue went to Honeywell.

In the early 1960s, Honeywell had built and sold a large number of H200 machines, together with software. In 1970 it had bought the computer business of General Electric.

=== LADC and the development of CP-6 ===
In 1976, Honeywell began developing the CP-6 system, including its operating system and program products to attract Xerox CP-V users (about 750 Sigma users) to buy and use Honeywell equipment. Honeywell employed an initial team of 60 programmers from the Xerox CP-V development team, and added another 30 programmers plus management and staff. Organized by Hank Hoagland and Shel Klee, the team was housed at an old Xerox marketing office at 5250 W. Century Blvd in Los Angeles, which became known as the Los Angeles Development Center (LADC). The new operating system was to be called CP-6. LADC reported administratively to the Honeywell computer group in Phoenix, a facility, which Honeywell had acquired from General Electric.

The first beta site was installed at Carleton University in Ottawa, Canada, in June 1979, and three other sites were installed before the end of 1979. Customers worked with LADC both directly and through the Exchange Users group throughout the specification and development period to review and approve the direction of development, the compromises and order of feature implementation.

Comshare, a major Xerox customer, but with their own operating system (Commander II), needed more capacity to service their rapidly expanding timesharing business. So, with the help of LADC hardware engineers and using the Xerox specifications, Honeywell engineers in Phoenix built 30 Sigma 9 computers, 24 for Comshare and six for other customers. This project was initiated in 1978, and the machines were sold at the original retail price and delivered beginning in the third quarter of 1979 until 1981.

== The CP-6 product ==
CP-6 was modeled on Xerox's CP-V. The code was completely rewritten in a new high-level language, PL-6, designed and built expressly for that purpose, rather than in assembly language as CP-V had been, because of increasing complexities of the new virtual addressing hardware (such as that in Honeywell's L66 and DPS 8 line). During the rewrite existing weaknesses were addressed and many new features added.

Like CP-V, CP-6 had five access modes, which operated concurrently: batch processing, remote batch, timesharing, transaction processing, and real-time processing. It included multiprogramming and operated on multiple CPUs.

Also like CP-V, the design was an integrated file management system. Files were equally and compatibly available to programs executing in any mode. The files could be sorted in indexed, keyed, relative, or consecutive order.

New in CP-6 was the use of communications and terminal interfaces through minicomputer (Honeywell Level 6)-based front-end processors, connected locally, remotely, or in combination through IMP (input manipulation processor).

CP-6 included an integrated software development system which supported and included a set of language processors: APL, BASIC, COBOL, FORTRAN, RPG, IDP, IDS/II, SORT/MERGE, PL-6, GMAP, and a text formatting program, TEXT. Commonly needed software packages (Pascal, SNOBOL, LISP, SPSS, BMDP, IMSL, SPICEII, and SLAM) were developed by Carleton University.

The operating system supported inter-system communication, job submission and file transfer between CP-6 systems and between CP-6 and CP-V and to and from IBM and other HASP protocol systems. The system used communications and terminal interfaces through a Honeywell Level 6 minicomputer-based front-end processor. Asynchronous, bisynchronous and TCP/IP communications protocols were supported.

The Honeywell hardware system for CP-6 consisted of a mainframe host processor (L66, DPS8, DPS8000, DPS90), to which connected disks, tapes, printers, and card equipment were connected. A high-speed channel connected this host to a Level 6 mini computer, which provided processing and connection for terminals, communications lines, and high-speed channel to remote computers, including LADC and customers for on-line support, new version download and problem fix patches. A terminal emulator allowed use of PCs as CP-6 terminals.

In 1979 or 1980, LADC system engineer Dave Platt developed and incorporated into the CP-6 operating system a print output identification feature called Edgemark. Invoked via JCL (job control language) parameters, Edgemark printed the username of the user submitting the print job and the job number, scaled to the number of output pages, on the perforated edge of the fanfold paper used by line printers of the time. This allowed the user or system operator to easily locate the start and end pages of a given print job in a large stack of printer output simply by looking at the stack.

Product additions in the mid eighties included adaptation for DPS8000 Bull mainframe computers.

Honeywell has released the source for CP-6, in the form of program listings.

== Product support ==
CP-6 included an on-line problem reporting and fix system, beginning in 1976, named the System Technical Action Request (STAR). The people who oversaw the STAR system were STARlords. Programmers had direct access to customers' computers, and could fix problems directly on-line. The system used Honeywell's proprietary network.
