= GUIDE International =

IBM User Group

GUIDE (Guidance for Users of Integrated Data-Processing Equipment, sometimes stylized as G.U.I.D.E.) was a users' group for users of IBM computer systems.

GUIDE was formed in 1956; it was incorporated in 1970 as a non-profit organization under the name of GUIDE International Corporation. As of 1990, GUIDE was the largest IBM users' group with 2850 members. Its membership included fifty percent of the Fortune 1000 companies.

"GUIDE's principal purposes are to contribute to the improvement of data processing products and services and to provide a forum for the development, exchange and dissemination of information concerning large data processing equipment and systems." "GUIDE's principal activity is the sponsorship of week-long conferences held three times each year."

In 1994 in Europe GUIDE merged with the European arm of SHARE, another major IBM users' group forming GSE (Guide Share Europe).

In the US GUIDE ceased operation in September 1999. Although the groups did not merge, many of GUIDE's activities and projects were taken over by SHARE, and GUIDE suggested to its members that they join SHARE. In August 2000, SHARE took over the guide.org domain name.

== See also ==
- COMMON
