= Itek =

American defense spy camera manufacturer

Itek Corporation
- Type: Defunct
- Industry: Graphic Arts Equipment, Optics
- Founded: United States, 1957
- Founder: Richard Leghorn
- Defunct: 1996
- Key people: Richard Leghorn, Founder; Tadeusz Walkowicz; Laurance Rockefeller, Venture capitalist

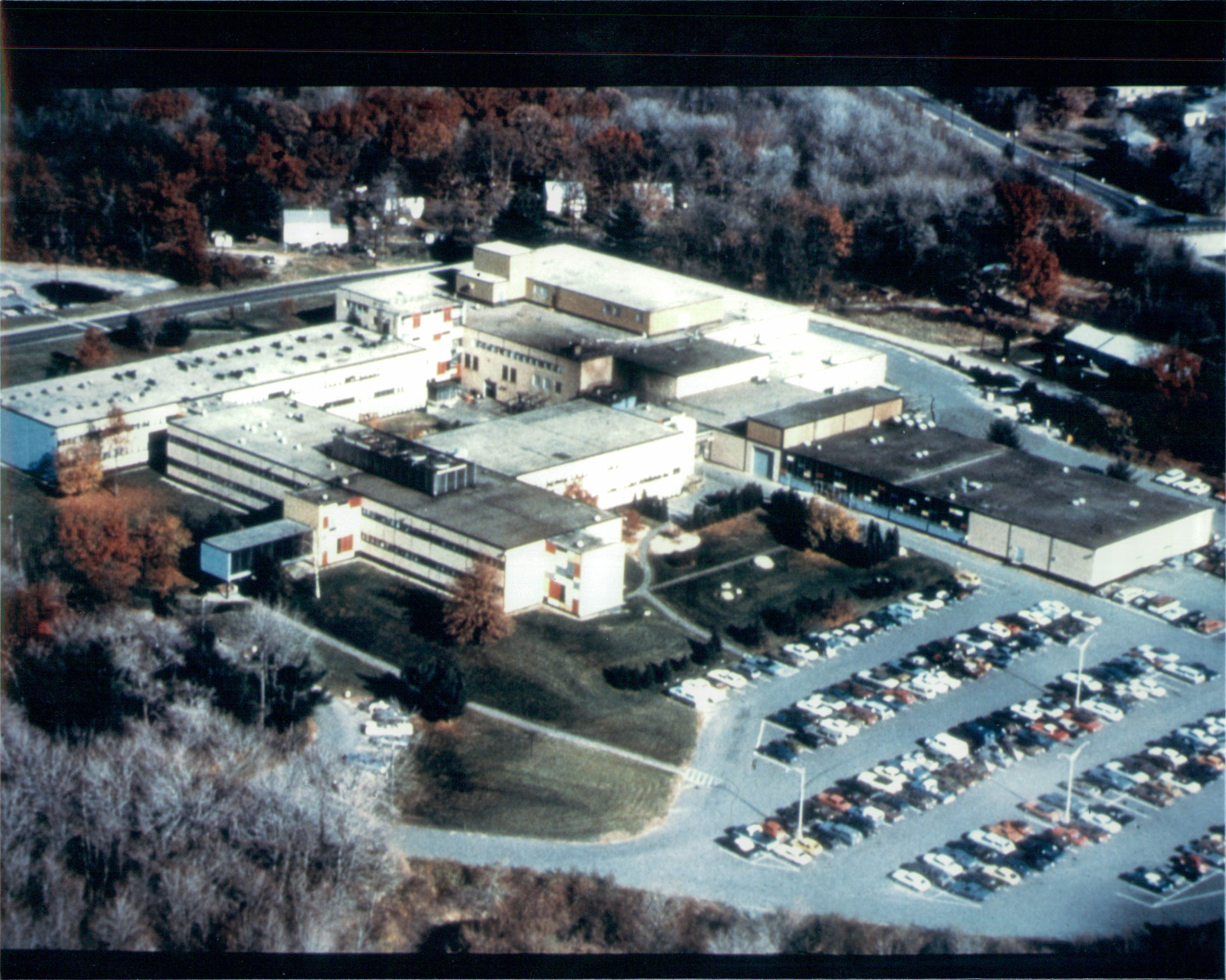
ITEK Corporation, Lexington, Massachusetts

Itek Corporation was a United States defense contractor that initially specialized in camera systems for spy satellites and various other reconnaissance systems. In the early 1960s they built a conglomerate in a fashion similar to LTV or Litton, during which time they developed the first CAD system and explored optical disc technology. These efforts were unsuccessful, and the company shed divisions to various companies, returning to its roots in the reconnaissance market. The remaining portions were eventually purchased by Litton in 1983, and then Hughes, Raytheon, and Goodrich Corporation.

== History ==
=== Beginnings ===
Richard Leghorn was a former United States Air Force (USAF) aerial reconnaissance expert who had first proposed flying reconnaissance missions over enemy territory in peacetime. Leghorn left the Air Force to become head of Eastman Kodak's European division, and started writing about the "Open Skies" proposal, which he strongly supported.

Open Skies proposed to allow any signing nation to overfly any other, which Leghorn believed would lower international tensions by allowing countries to verify the actions of their adversaries. Eisenhower raised the issue at the 1955 Geneva summit meetings as a way to reduce mutual fears of a surprise attack. At the time, the United States would have had a huge advantage if Open Skies was adopted, as their numerous European and Asian airbases would allow them access to the Soviet heartland, while the lack of USSR bases in the Americas — this being prior to the Cuban Revolution — would have made the treaty an empty promise. Unsurprisingly, the Soviets opposed Open Skies, something Eisenhower later admitted he fully expected.

While Leghorn's writings on the topic were being widely read, he was secretly informed that the United States had already taken him up on his initial proposal, and the United States Air Force (and Royal Air Force) were in the process of flying reconnaissance flights over the USSR. Aware that this would generate vast amounts of photography over long periods of time, Leghorn realized that a major problem would be storing the resulting imagery and allowing it to be easily retrieved for study. Kodak was in the process of introducing its "Minicard" aperture card product, and Leghorn felt this was a natural solution for the problem. Leghorn sought improvement by combining it with machinery dedicated to the task of indexing the information required for reconnaissance. Leghorn contacted his long-time friend Theodore "Teddy" Walkowicz about forming a new company to build such a machine for the Air Force. Walkowicz was an associate of venture capitalist Laurance Rockefeller, and eventually secured a seed loan for $600,000 in exchange for a directorship. Leghorn became president of the new company, whose ITEK name was a phonetic short form of "information technology". Since Leghorn formerly worked at Kodak, there is speculation that the company name was an acronym for "I Took Eastman Kodak".

=== Corona ===
Weeks after the company formed in late 1957, Leghorn took it in an entirely different direction by purchasing the Boston University Physical Research Laboratory (BUPRL), which researched reconnaissance cameras. BUPRL was designing the HYAC-1 camera for the USAF's reconnaissance balloon efforts, cameras that would eventually fly on the WS-461L balloons during 1957. Now at Itek, the company won contracts for similar cameras for aircraft like the U-2 and SR-71.

The CIA quickly informed them of their top secret Corona to produce the first spy satellites, and asked them to bid on the camera systems. Itek returned a design that used a rotating mirror to record panoramic swaths of the ground. Film was delivered from a canister and wrapped around a cylindrical window that allowed the maximum length of film to be used in a single exposure, increasing resolution. The rotation of the mirror was timed to properly account for the movement of the satellite to avoid stretching the images on-film. The result was a single long photograph showing a "strip" of land. At the time, the CIA had already contracted Fairchild Camera and Instrument to supply cameras, but Itek's submission was technically superior and won them the contract in March or April 1958. To soften the blow, the CIA had Fairchild build the devices until Itek could start its own manufacturing capabilities.

Leghorn was upset by the terms of the agreement, and at one point in 1959 issued a "stop work" order on the project to change its terms. The CIA quickly acquiesced, although they were spooked by the event. Had Itek lost the Corona contract, it was highly likely that the company would have collapsed. This possibility so worried the CIA that they arranged a personal meeting between Rockefeller and the CIA's chief of technical development, Richard Bissell, to inform Rockefeller of the Corona project and make him aware that national security rested on the company's well-being. Leghorn, he felt, needed direct supervision.

Shortly after winning Corona, Itek also won the contract for the Air Force's satellite program, SAMOS. SAMOS originally envisioned a semi-real-time system that downloaded imagery via an onboard scanner, but later expanded to envision a number of different imaging systems based on a single airframe. One of these, E-5, was a project to provide low-resolution wide-area imagery for mapping purposes, which the Air Force needed to plan ingress routes for bombers during war. The SAMOS project was eventually abandoned, leaving several of the E-5 cameras in storage at a Lockheed facility.

=== Diversification efforts ===
After winning the CORONA contract, Itek quickly grew from the executive staff to a company employing over a hundred scientists, engineers, and technicians. After only a year its revenues were in the millions, and the company started the process of raising an initial public offering. In public the company stated that while their work was classified, they were working in the field of "information management" (some writers have commented that this may be the first use of the term). The real reasons for this growth - the BURPL purchase - remained secret, so on paper it appeared that Itek's information systems were generating huge orders that demanded a large staff. Writers speculated that the military might allow the company to release their work to the public, making the company highly valuable. Over the space of a few months, the value of the stock grew from $2 to $255, triggering a 5-for-1 split.

Using the newly inflated value of their stock, Leghorn started an aggressive diversification effort. In 1960 Leghorn agreed to fund development of a computerized drafting system, EDM, based on the PDP-1 that had earlier been experimented on at MIT. The same year he arranged a merger with Hermes Electronics (originally Hycon Eastern), makers of various military communications systems. This was followed by the 1961 purchase of Photostat Corp., maker of offset printing systems using Kodak patents. In 1962 he lured Gilbert King away from IBM, where he had worked on the Automatic Language Translator and had developed the world's only working optical disc. Meanwhile, work continued on the original archiving system, but the company proved unable to deliver a working product.

Meanwhile, none of Itek's purchases turned into commercial successes, and in 1961 Itek reported a $2,500,000 loss. Its stock began to drop, hitting a low of $9.50. In spite of the CIA's warnings, Rockefeller did little to address Leghorn's problems, which grew out of control. Frustrated by Leghorn ignoring the reconnaissance side of the company in favor of the continuing string of information projects, the engineers revolted and demanded that he be removed. Walkowicz brought in Franklin Lindsay, a former CIA operative, to help Leghorn get the company back on track. This effort backfired, as Leghorn was insulted by the effort and refused to cooperate. In May 1962 Leghorn was pushed out in favor of Lindsay, who became Itek's president and CEO.

With Lindsay at the helm, Itek returned to focusing mostly on reconnaissance efforts, although by this point their photocopying machines were starting to become successful as well. As a side-effect of this newfound focus, Lindsay shed a number of Leghorn's acquisitions. The first to go was the EDM project in 1962, which ironically became a profitable division of Control Data as their Digigraphics system.

By 1964 Lindsay had returned the company to profitability. By this time the CORONA program had overcome its initial failures and had become a success. Itek would eventually deliver about 200 panoramic cameras for the CORONA program. A further success involved the E-5 cameras originally built for the SAMOS project. In 1961 CORONA delivered low-resolution imagery of a new installation that became known as the "Tallinn line". A debate broke out over their significance; some suggested that it was an antiballistic missile installation using the SA-5 Gammon missile, while others pointed out that the resolution was too low to say anything of the sort. A rush effort started at Lockheed to adapt the E-5 camera to the existing CORONA airframe, resulting in the LANYARD project, today known as the KH-6. The project was, generally, a failure. Three satellites were launched, one returning no film and one only blank frames.

=== Formation of the NRO ===
Both the CIA and Air Force continued development of new satellite systems, which led to concerns about the proper use of these valuable and expensive resources. These concerns eventually led to the formation of the National Reconnaissance Office (NRO) in 1961, with the overall mission of ensuring that satellite data was distributed properly, and that the satellite time was not wasted, either by photographing the same area twice, or by allowing an area of interest to be photographed by the first available means. Although the Air Force was able to work within the new environment without any apparent problems, creation of the NRO led to serious political infighting with the CIA.

In 1963 Albert "Bud" Wheelon took over from Bissell as the CIA's chief of technology development. Unlike Bissell, who worked almost entirely with outside contractors, Wheelon started internalizing the process and built up a much larger department. In October 1963 he suggested forming the "Satellite Photography Working Group" to study their current efforts and suggest improvements. Under the new agreements, the NRO was supposed to supply funding for the effort, and on 18 November they agreed. In a following experiment the team attempted to determine the optimal resolution for satellite photography, degrading a series of high-quality photographs in stages to see how much information could be pulled from them at different levels of detail. The results strongly suggested building a new satellite with a 2-foot resolution, something what would not be able to be done by improving the existing CORONA system, which offered 10–25 foot resolution. The NRO declined to offer funding for the satellite, however, so Wheelon arranged funding from its own budget and started the "FULCRUM" effort.

When news of the FULCRUM efforts later found their way to the NRO, a major fight broke out that eventually landed on the desk of Robert McNamara. NRO was supposed to be in charge of coordinating development, and was at that point funding development of the Air Force's 18-inch resolution design, KH-7 "GAMBIT". Stung by the outcome, the project suffered a further setback when Itek announced that they would no longer work on FULCRUM's camera because of a demand that they felt was unreasonable, although other sources suggested it was the final result of a long stream of demands and design changes coming from the newly enlarged CIA division. Wheelon retaliated by handing the contract to Perkin-Elmer, which delivered the cameras for what would become the successful KH-9 "HEXAGON", better known as "Big Bird".

There are two different versions of the story of what followed. Richelson states that the NRO quickly handed Itek a contract for their own "S-2" system, a follow-on to the Air Force's troubled SAMOS program. This project had originally selected a Kodak camera, and changed to an Itek design after their FULCRUM announcement. He notes the suggestion that the offer was pre-arranged, in order to deprive the CIA of their camera, and thereby doom the FULCRUM effort. Lewis states that both the FULCRUM and S-2 projects had already been handed to Itek, and it was the internal power struggles between the CIA and NRO that led to Wheelon's stream of demands as punishment for accepting the S2 work. Whatever the story, Itek was no longer the CIA's primary supplier after CORONA and LANYARD ended, allowing Perkin-Elmer to become a major supplier. S-2 was later downgraded.

=== Through the 1970s ===
Into this void came a number of different projects. One of these was the KA-80 "Optical Bar Camera" that flew on both the U-2 and SR-71, as well as a further development of the mapping camera from SAMOS/LANYARD that was used on some of the Big Birds. Itek also found a customer for their panoramic cameras with NASA, who used them both on Project Apollo for mapping the lunar surface, as well as Project Viking's Mars landers. Later they built portions of the Keck Telescope and similar projects.

During the same period, Itek's Graphic Systems division, originally supplying the printing systems, had greatly diversified.

=== Litton purchase ===
In 1982 Litton Industries was attempting to diversify their military holdings, and engaged Lehman Brothers to arrange the purchase of a company specializing in electronic warfare. Lehman found a number of companies that Litton might be interested in, including Itek, presenting a report on 20 September 1982. In October, Litton started purchasing Itek stock in the market in an effort to gain control of about 4.9% of the common shares before making a friendly takeover offer.

On 23 November the chairmen of the two companies met, and by January 1983 the negotiations had progressed to the point of making a formal offer. At the advice of Lehman Brothers, Litton made an offer of the current market price plus a 50% premium. During this period the value of Itek stock was rising, so Litton had to increase their offer on several occasions. On 12 January 1983, Litton made an offer of $48, which succeeded on 4 March 1983. Itek became Litton's Itek Division, although the Itek Graphic Systems division was sold off in 1985.

In 1986 it was revealed that a Lehman Brothers trader had been purchasing Itek stock during the negotiations, part of a wider insider trading scandal. Ira Sokolow, part of the Lehman team arranging the Itek purchase, had leaked information about the deal to another Lehman employee, Dennis Levine. They agreed to make insider trades to drive up the stock price and then split the profits. Levine and other traders at Lehman (either tipped off or simply following Levine's trades) started collecting Itek stock and were thus rewarded with part of the 50% premium when the deal closed. Litton later sued Lehman, claiming that their purchase would have been at a lower price had the insider trading not occurred. The stock price rose from $26 to $33 during this period, meaning that had the price stayed at $26 a fair offer would have been $39. A lengthy series of court cases followed.

=== Hughes, Raytheon, and Goodrich purchase ===
Litton downsized dramatically in the 1990s, selling off many of its components. In 1996 Hughes Electronics purchased what was then left of Itek, Itek Optical Systems. At the time they announced that Itek's own facilities in Lexington, Massachusetts would fold into their own Hughes Danbury Optical Systems in Danbury, CT. Later in the 1990s, after Raytheon's purchase of Hughes, Itek became Raytheon Optical Systems Company. In early 2000, Raytheon divested the Optical Systems group and it was purchased by Goodrich Corporation. Goodrich Corporation was subsequently purchased by United Technologies Corporation headquartered in East Hartford, Connecticut.

== See also ==
- Itek Advanced Technology Airborne Computer, 16-bit computer used on Galileo (spacecraft).

== Bibliography ==
- Jonathan Lewis, "Spy Capitalism: Itek and the CIA", Yale University Press, 2002, ISBN 0-300-09192-3
- Jeffrey Richelson, "The Wizards of Langley: Inside the CIA's Directorate of Science and Technology", Westview Press, 2002, ISBN 0-8133-4059-4
- "Litton Industries, Inc., v. Lehman Brothers Kuhn Loeb", 967 F.2d 742
- "Itek Refocused", Time 8 November 1963
- "Litton's Itek division revealed as supplier of space cameras for first U.S. spy satellites". Business Wire. May 23, 1995.
- David Weisberg, "The First Commercial CAD System", The Engineering Design Revolution, 2006
- David Kosowsky, "Alumni Profiles", RLE currents, MIT, Fall 1996 pg. 10
