= PL.8 =

Programming language

- Designed by: IBM

PL.8 is a dialect of PL/I (Programming Language One) developed by IBM Research in the 1970s by the compiler group, under Martin Hopkins, within a major research program that led to the IBM RISC architecture. The ".8" in the name was intended to suggest it was about 80% of PL/I. Written in PL/I and bootstrapped via the PL/I Optimizing compiler, it was an alternative to PL/S for system programming, compiling initially to an intermediate machine-independent language with symbolic registers and machine-like operations. It applied machine-independent program optimization techniques to this intermediate language to produce exceptionally good object code. The intermediate language was mapped by the back-end to the target machine's register architecture and instruction set. Back-ends were written for IBM 801, S/370, Motorola 68000, and POWER/PowerPC.

== Use ==
A version was used on IBM mainframes as a development tool for software that was being designed for the IBM AS/400, as well as to write the "i370" internal code for the "Capitol" chipset used in the IBM 9377 processor and some ES/9370 models and the millicode for S/390 and z/Architecture processors.
