= IBM 701 =

Vacuum-tube computer system

IBM 701 Electronic Data Processing Machine
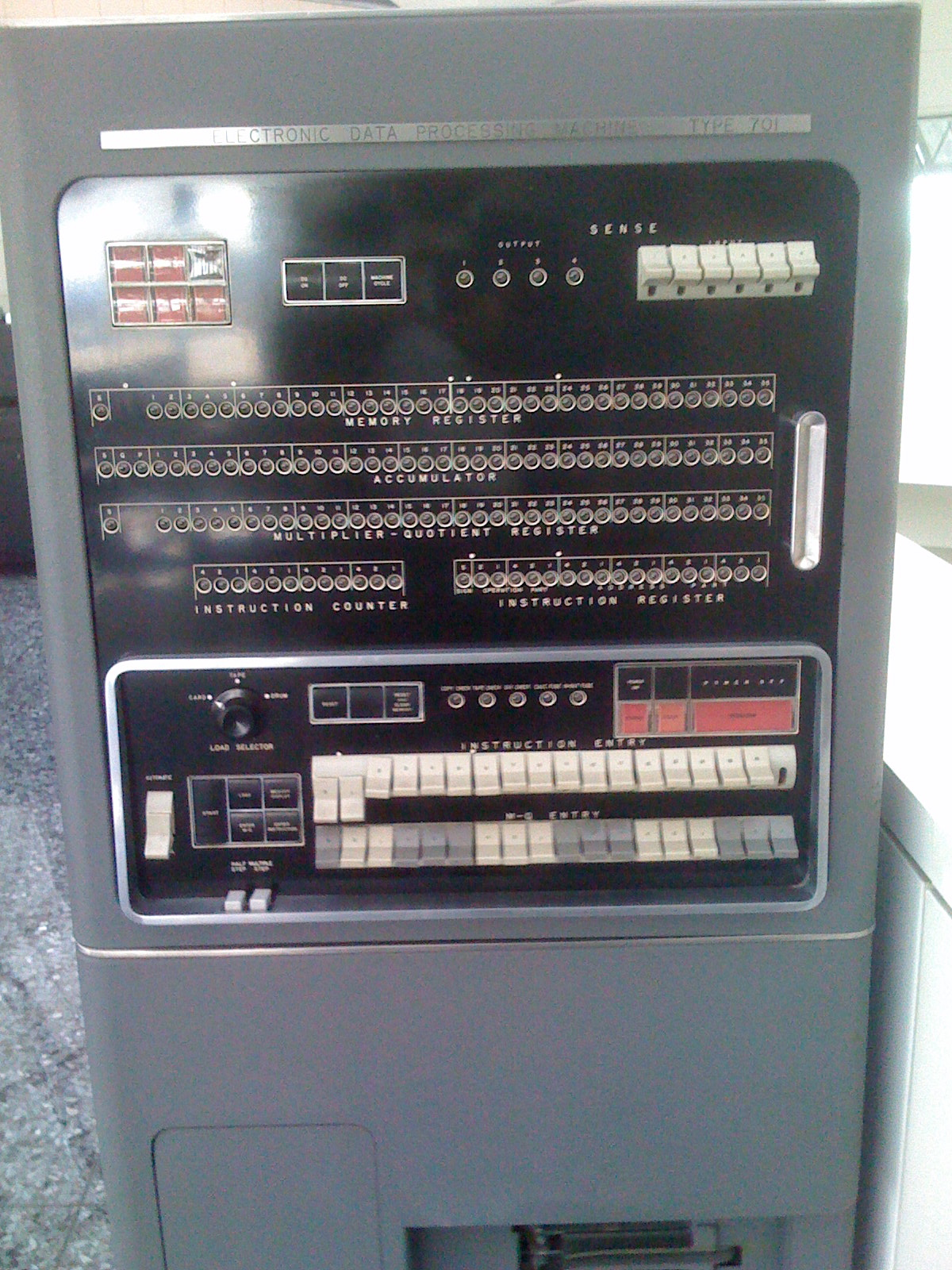
- IBM 701 operator's console
- Also known as: Defense Calculator
- Developer: Jerrier Haddad; Nathaniel Rochester
- Manufacturer: IBM
- Released: 1952; 74 years ago
- Introductory price: $12,000 a month rental charge / $15,000 a month per 40-hour shift
- Units shipped: 19
- Memory: Total memory of 2048 words of 36 bits each (72 Williams tubes with a capacity of 1024 bits each)
- Successor: IBM 704

The IBM 701 Electronic Data Processing Machine, known as the Defense Calculator while in development, was IBM's first commercial scientific computer and its first series production mainframe computer, which was announced to the public on May 21, 1952. It was designed and developed by Jerrier Haddad and Nathaniel Rochester and was based on the IAS machine at Princeton.

The IBM 701 was the first computer in the IBM 700/7000 series, which were IBM's high-end computers until the arrival of the IBM System/360 in 1964.

The business-oriented sibling of the 701 was the IBM 702 and a lower-cost general-purpose sibling was the IBM 650, which gained fame as the first mass-produced computer.

== History ==
IBM 701 competed with Remington Rand's UNIVAC 1103 in the scientific computation market. In early 1954, a committee of the Joint Chiefs of Staff requested that the two machines be compared for the purpose of using them for a Joint Numerical Weather Prediction project. Based on the trials, the two machines had comparable computational speed, with a slight advantage for IBM's machine, however when it came to input/output the 701 was favored unanimously for its significantly faster input/output equipment.

Nineteen IBM 701 systems were installed. The first 701 was delivered to IBM's world headquarters in New York. Eight went to aircraft companies. At the Lawrence Livermore National Laboratory, having an IBM 701 meant that scientists could run nuclear explosives computations faster.

"I think there is a world market for maybe five computers" is often attributed to Thomas Watson Sr., chairman and CEO of IBM, in 1943. This misquote may stem from a statement by his son, Thomas Watson Jr. at the 1953 IBM annual stockholders' meeting. Watson Jr. was describing the market acceptance of the IBM 701 computer. Before production began, Watson visited with 20 companies that were potential customers. This is what he said at the stockholders' meeting, "as a result of our trip, on which we expected to get orders for five machines, we came home with orders for 18”.

Aviation Week for 11 May 1953 says the 701 rental charge was about $12,000 (equivalent to $144,000 in 2025) per month; American Aviation 9 Nov 1953 says "$15,000 a month per 40-hour shift. A second 40-hour shift ups the rental to $20,000 a month".

The successor of the 701 was the index register-equipped IBM 704, introduced 4 years after the 701. The 704 was not compatible with the 701, however, as the 704 increased the size of instructions from 18 bits to 36 bits to support the extra features. The 704 also marked the transition to magnetic-core memory.

== Social impact ==
In 1952, IBM paired with language scholars from Georgetown University to develop translation software for use on computers. On January 7, 1954, the team developed an experimental software program that allowed the IBM 701 computer to translate from Russian to English. This was the Georgetown–IBM experiment. The Mark 1 Translating Device, which was developed for the US Air Force, was able to produce its first automated Russian-to-English translation in 1959 and was shown to the public in 1964.

In 1954, a group of scientists ran millions of simulated hands of blackjack on an IBM 701 looking to determine the best playing decision for every combination of cards. The result of the study was the set of correct rules for hitting, standing, doubling or splitting in a blackjack game which are still the same today.

The IBM 701 has a claim to be the first computer displaying the potential of artificial intelligence in Arthur Samuel's checkers-playing program on February 24, 1956. The program, which was developed for play on the IBM 701, was demonstrated to the public on television. Self-proclaimed checkers master Robert Nealey played the game on an IBM 7094 computer in 1962 and the computer won. It is still considered a milestone for artificial intelligence and it offered the public during the early 1960s an example of the capabilities of an electronic computer.

The University of California Radiation Laboratory at Livermore developed a language compilation and runtime system called the KOMPILER for their IBM 701. Speedcode was the first high-level programming language created for an IBM computer. The language was developed by John Backus in 1953 for the IBM 701 to support computation with floating-point numbers. The Fortran compiler also developed by Backus was not released by IBM until the IBM 704.

== Description ==
=== Hardware configuration ===
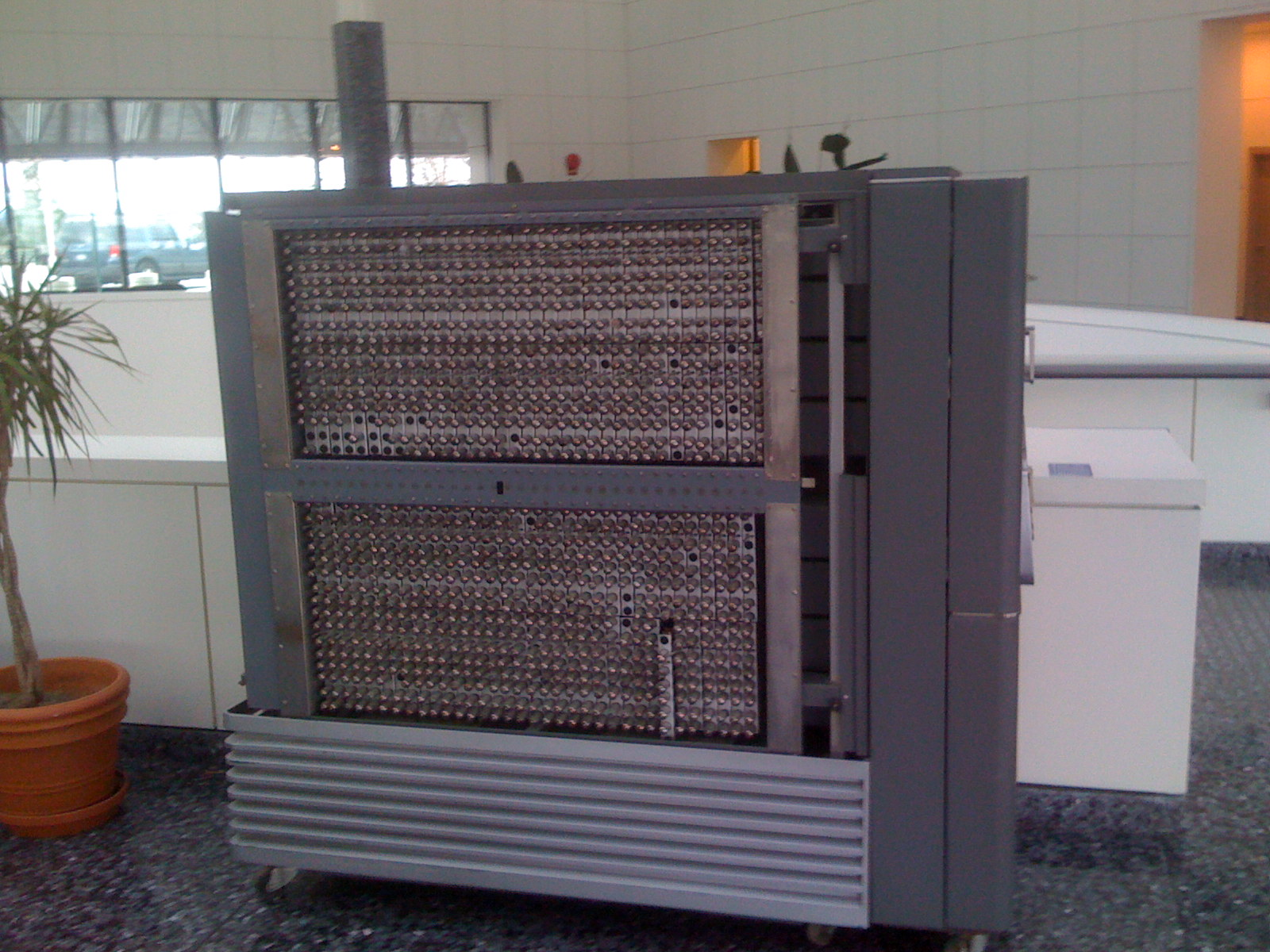
IBM 701 processor frame, showing 1071 of the vacuum tubes

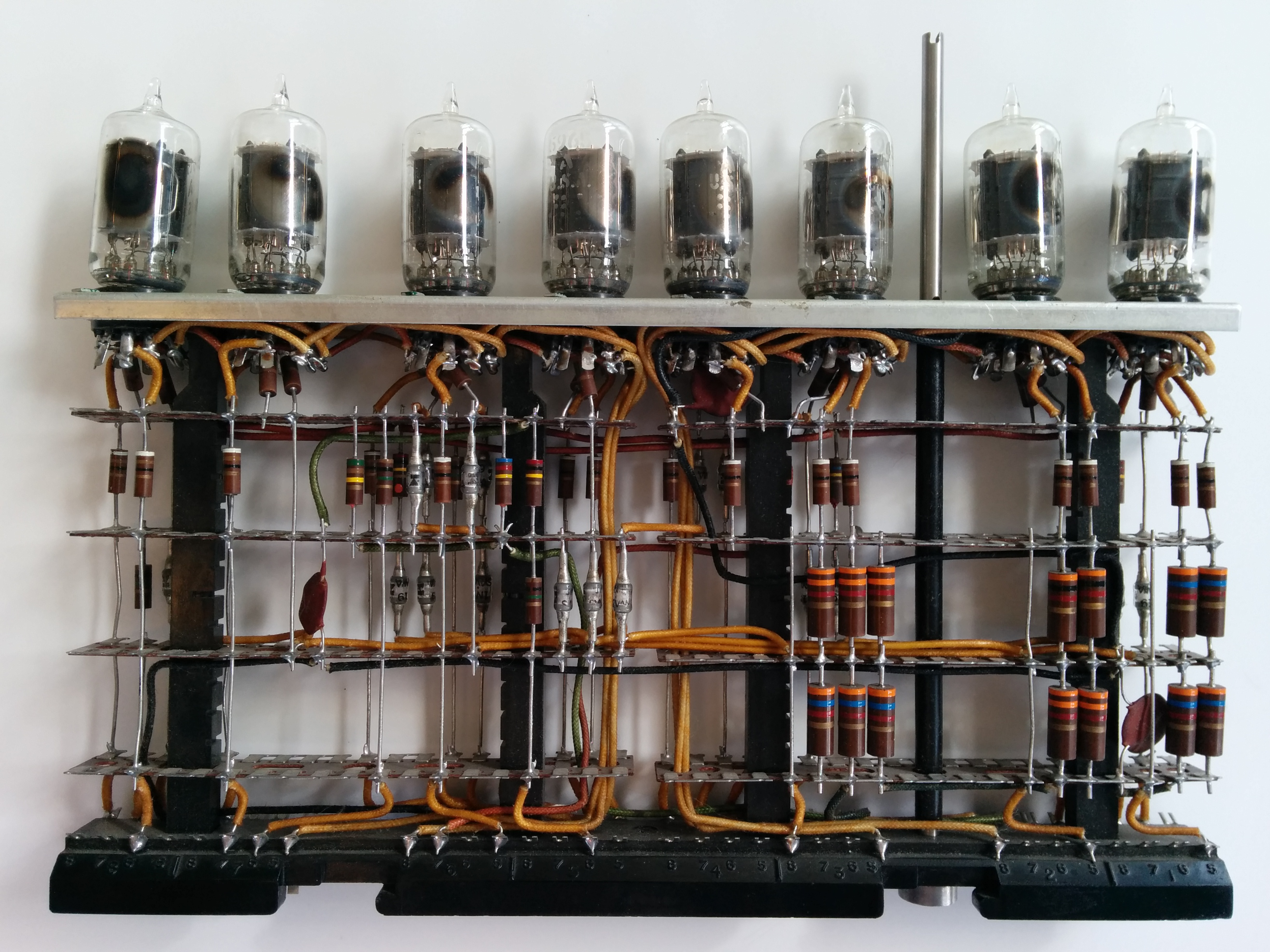
Vacuum tube logic module from a 700 series IBM computer.

The IBM 701 system was composed of the following units:

- IBM 701 - Analytical Control Unit (CPU)
- IBM 706 - Electrostatic Storage Unit (2048 words of Williams tube Memory)
- IBM 711 - Punched Card Reader (150 cards/min.)
- IBM 716 - Printer (150 lines/min.)
- IBM 721 - Punched Card Recorder (100 cards/min.)
- IBM 726 - Magnetic Tape Reader/Recorder (100 bits/inch)
- IBM 727 - Magnetic Tape Reader/Recorder (200 bits/inch)
- IBM 731 - Magnetic Drum Reader/Recorder
- IBM 736 - Power Frame #1
- IBM 737 - Magnetic Core Storage Unit (4096 words of 12 μs core memory)
- IBM 740 - Cathode Ray Tube Output Recorder
- IBM 741 - Power Frame #2
- IBM 746 - Power Distribution Unit
- IBM 753 - Magnetic Tape Control Unit (controlled up to ten IBM 727s)

The total weight (depending on configuration) was about 20,516 pounds (10.3 short tons; 9.3 t).

=== Memory ===
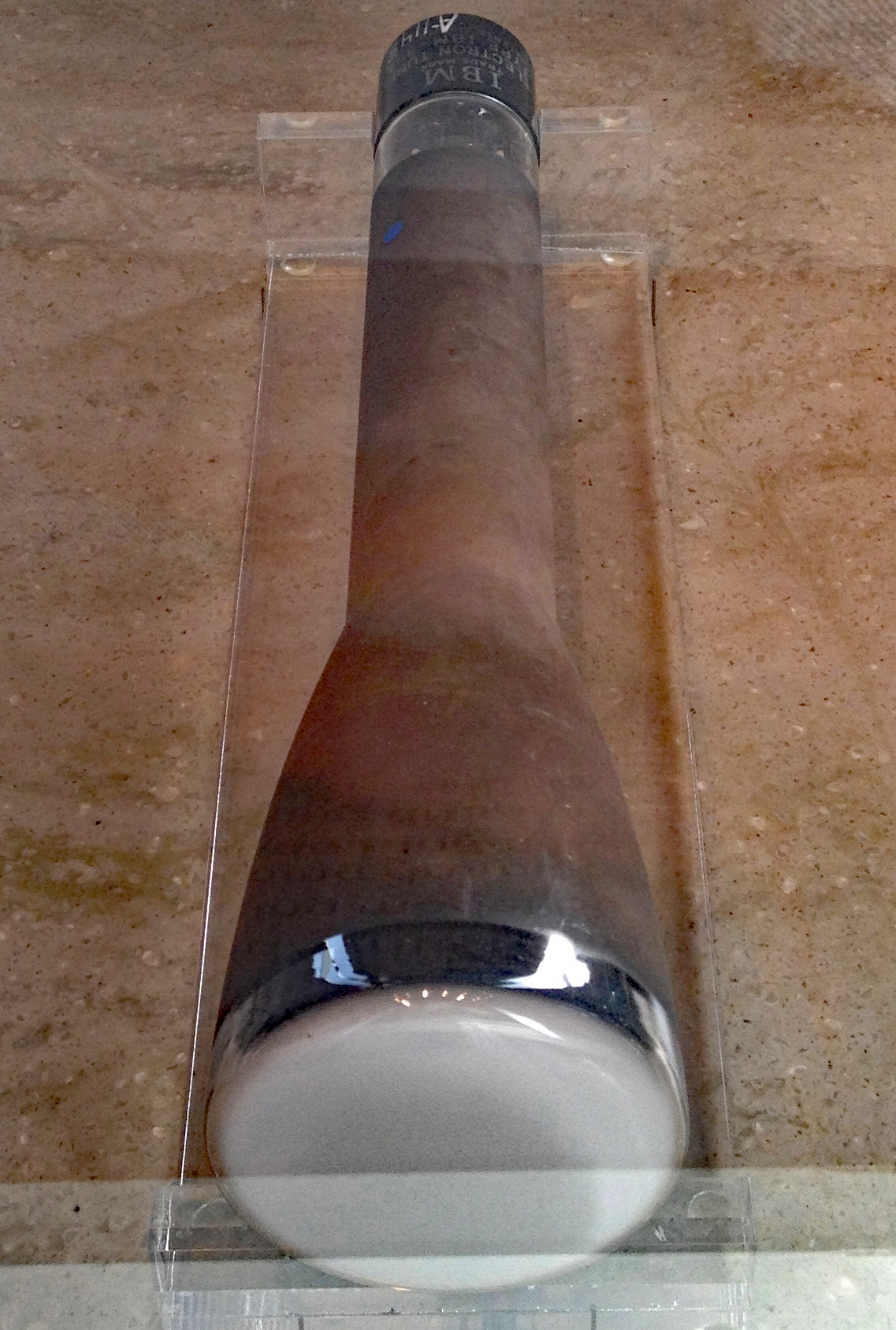
Williams tube from an IBM 701 at the Computer History Museum

The system used vacuum tube logic circuitry and electrostatic storage, consisting of 72 Williams tubes with a capacity of 1024 bits each, giving a total memory of 2048 words of 36 bits each. Each of the 72 Williams tubes was 3 inches in diameter. Memory could be expanded to a maximum of 4096 words of 36 bits by the addition of a second set of 72 Williams tubes or (later) by replacing the entire memory with magnetic-core memory. The Williams tube memory and later core memory each had a memory cycle time of 12 microseconds. The Williams tube memory required periodic refreshing, mandating the insertion of refresh cycles into the 701's timing. An addition operation required five 12-microsecond cycles, two of which were refresh cycles, while a multiplication or division operation required 38 cycles (456 microseconds). In addition, magnetic drum and magnetic tape were utilized for secondary storage.

=== Instruction set ===
Instructions were 18 bits long, single address.

- Sign (1 bit) - Whole word (-) or Half word (+) operand address
- Opcode (5 bits) - 32 instructions
- Address (12 bits) - 4096 Half word addresses

Numbers were either 36 bits or 18 bits long, signed magnitude, fixed point. The full word has a precision of about ten decimal digits. A decimal digit corresponds to $log_2 10$ or 3.322 bits.

The IBM 701 had only two programmer accessible registers:

1. The accumulator was 38 bits long (adding two overflow bits).
2. The multiplier/quotient register was 36 bits long.

=== Peripherals ===
The Magnetic Drum Reader/Recorder was added on the recommendation of John von Neumann, who said it would reduce the need for high speed I/O.

The first magnetic tape drives were used on the Tape Processing Machine (TPM) and then adapted to the 701.

== IBM 701 customers ==
List of customers
- IBM World Headquarters, New York, N.Y. (1952)
- University of California., Los Alamos, N.M. (1953)
- Lockheed Aircraft Company, Glendale, Cal. (1953)
- National Security Agency, Washington, D.C. (1953)
- Douglas Aircraft Company, Santa Monica, Cal. (1953)
- General Electric Company., Lockland, Ohio (1953)
- Convair, Fort Worth, Tex. (1953)
- U.S. Navy, Inyokern, Cal. (1953)
- United Aircraft, East Hartford, Conn. (1953)
- North American Aviation, Santa Monica, Cal. (1953)
- Rand Corporation., Santa Monica, Cal. (1953)
- Boeing Corporation, Seattle, Wash. (1953)
- Douglas Aircraft Company, El Segundo, Cal. (1954)
- Naval Aviation Supply, Philadelphia, Pa. (1954)
- University of California, Livermore, Cal. (1954)
- General Motors Corporation, Detroit, Mich. (1954)
- Lockheed Aircraft Company, Glendale, Cal. (1954)
- U.S. Weather Bureau, Washington, D.C. (1955)
- Dupont Central Research, Wilmington, DE (1954)

== See also ==
- BINAC, first commercially available computer
- Ferranti Mark 1, first working commercially available computer
- IBM 700/7000 series
- LEO (computer), first commercially available computer for business applications
- List of IBM products
- List of vacuum-tube computers
- SHARE (computing)
- Strela computer, comparable Soviet design
