= SHARE (computing) =

User group for IBM mainframe computing

- SHARE logo as of 2021
- Formation: 1955; 71 years ago
- Purpose: User group for IBM mainframe computers
- Location: Los Angeles-area
- Website: www.share.org

SHARE Inc. is a volunteer-run user group for IBM mainframe computers that was founded in 1955 by Los Angeles-area users of the IBM 704 computer system. It evolved into a forum for exchanging technical information about programming languages, operating systems, database systems, and user experiences for enterprise users of small, medium, and large-scale IBM computers such as IBM S/360, IBM S/370, zSeries, pSeries, and xSeries. Despite the capitalization of all letters in the name, the official website says "SHARE is not an acronym; it's what we do."

== Overview ==
A major resource of SHARE from the beginning was the SHARE library. Originally, IBM distributed what software it provided in source form and systems programmers commonly made small local additions or modifications and exchanged them with other users. The SHARE library and the process of distributed development it fostered was one of the major origins of open source software.

In 1959 SHARE released the SHARE Operating System (SOS), originally for the IBM 709 computer, later ported to the IBM 7090. SOS was one of the first instances of "commons-based peer production" now widely used in the development of free and open-source software such as Linux and the GNU project. In 1963 SHARE participated with IBM in the development of the PL/I programming language as part of the "3x3" committee.

In 1969, members of SHARE in Europe formed a European Chapter of the organisation, which was formalised in 1966 as the "Share European Association (SEAS)", later SHARE Europe (SEAS). The last meeting of 1994 was jointly held with G.U.I.D.E. At this meeting it was decided to dissolve both SHARE Europe and G.U.I.D.E. and establish the new European IBM users group GSE (Guide Share Europe).

SHARE later incorporated as a non-profit corporation based in Chicago, Illinois and as of 2013 is located at 330 N. Wabash Ave. The organization produces a newsletter and conducts two major educational meetings per year.

In September 1999, GUIDE International, the other major IBM mainframe users group, ceased operation. Although SHARE did not formally take over GUIDE in the United States, many of the activities and projects that were undertaken under the aegis of GUIDE moved to SHARE, and GUIDE suggested to its members that they join SHARE. In August 2000, SHARE took over the guide.org domain name.

In 2005 SHARE's membership of 20,000 represented some 2,300 enterprise IBM customers.

== See also ==
- History of free software
- IBM Type-III Library
- DECUS
- Seven tiers of disaster recovery
- COMMON
