= General Motors Research Laboratories =

General Motors Research Laboratories are the part of General Motors responsible for creation of the first known operating system (GM-NAA I/O) in 1955 and contributed to the first mechanical heart, the Dodrill-GMR, successfully used while performing open heart surgery.

== See also ==
- Multiple Console Time Sharing System

== Facts ==
First true operating systems (mid-1950s) GM-NAA I/O (1956) Developed by General Motors Research for IBM computers First real operating system (batch processing).
