= RY =

Ry is an abbreviation for railway and relay.

Ry, RY, or ry may also refer to:

== People ==
=== First name ===
- Ry Bradley (born 1980), American singer and musician
- Ry Cooder (born 1947), American musician
- Ry Nikonova (1942–2014), Russian artist
- Ry Rocklen (born 1978), American artist
- Ry Russo-Young (born 1981), American filmmaker
- RY X (born 1988), Australian musician
- Ryland Rose, Australian rapper formerly known as Ry

=== Surname ===
- Paul du Ry (1640–1714), French architect
- Simon Louis du Ry (1726–1799), French architect and grandson of Paul du Ry
- Na Ry (born 1985), South Korean beauty queen
- Trần Thị Hoa Ry (born 1976), Vietnamese politician

== Places ==
=== Denmark ===
- Ry, Denmark, town in Jutland
  - Ry train station
- Ry Municipality, former municipality in Jutland

=== France ===
- Auzouville-sur-Ry, commune in Normandy
- Grainville-sur-Ry, commune in Normandy
- Ry, Seine-Maritime, administrative division in Normandy

== Science and technology ==
- Rydberg constant, unit of energy used in quantum physics related to the ground state energy of the hydrogen atom
- Consolidated RY, former cargo aircraft of the U.S. Navy
- RY Sagittarii, star in the constellation Sagittarius
- RY Tauri, star in the constellation Taurus
- RY (test signal), character string used to test five-level teleprinter channels

== Business and finance ==
- Rekisteröity yhdistys ('ry' or 'ry.'), a Finnish non-profit organization (lit. 'registered association')
- Royal Bank of Canada (stock symbol RY on tsx2 and nyse2)

== Other ==
- Operation RY, Japanese plan to invade South Pacific islands during World War II
- "Ry Tanindrazanay malala ô!", national anthem of Madagascar

== See also ==
- RI (disambiguation)
