= List of information system character sets =

This list provides an inventory of character coding standards mainly before modern standards like ISO/IEC 646 etc. Some of these standards have been deeply involved in historic events that still have consequences. One notable example of this is the ITA2 coding used during World War II (1939–1945). The nature of these standards is not as common knowledge like it is for ASCII or EBCDIC or their slang names. While 8-bit is the de facto standard as of 2016, in the past 5-bit and 6-bit were more prevalent or their multiple.

Code	Introduction	Width	Usage
Morse code	c. 1837–1840	varies	Electrical telegraphs
Baudot code / ITA1	1870	5 bits	Piano-like telegraph operation, SIGCUM cipher operation
Chinese telegraph code	1881	4 digits	Chinese telegraph communications
Murray code	1901	5 bits	Machine run telegraph operation using punched paper, moved optimization from minimal operator fatigue to minimal machinery wear
ITA2	1924	5 bits	Teletypewrite, Telecommunications devices for the deaf (TDD), Telex, Amateur radio, Radioteletype (RTTY), Financial info by Deutsche Börse, Enigma machine and T52 during WWII
BCDIC	1928	6 bits	Introduced with the IBM card
FIELDATA	1956	6/7 bits	Battlefield information (USA)
CDC display code	1963	6 bits	Control Data Corporation computers
DEC SIXBIT/ECMA-1	1963	6 bits	Digital Equipment
EBCDIC	1963	8 bits	IBM computers
ASCII	1963-06-17 (ASA X3.4-1963)	7 bits	Teleprinters and computers; original definition of ASCII
GOST 10859	1964	4/5/6/7 bits	Soviet Union
ECMA-6	1965-04-30	7 bits	ASCII localization
ISO 646	1967 (ISO/R646-1967)	7 bits	ASCII localization
ASCII	1967 (USAS X3.4-1967)	7 bits	Close to "modern" definition of ASCII
Transcode	1967	7 bits	IBM data transmission terminal 2780, 3780
Recommendation V.3 IA5	1968	7 bits
MARC-8	1968	7 bits	Library computer systems
Braille ASCII	1969	6/7 bits	Tactile print for blind persons
JIS X 0201	1969	6/7 bits	First Japanese electronic character set
ECMA-48	1972	7 bits	Terminal text manipulation and colors
ISO/IEC 8859	1987	8 bits	International codes
ISO/IEC 10646 (Unicode)	1991	21 bits usable, packed into 8/16/32-bit code units	Unified encoding for most of the world's writing systems. As first introduced in 1991 had 16 bits; extension to 21 bits came later.
KPS 9566	1993		North Korean 2-byte character code set

== See also ==
- ANSEL
- SBCS (single-byte character set)
- DBCS (double-byte character set)
- TBCS (triple-byte character set)
- ITU T.61
- DEC Radix-50
- Cork encoding
- Prosigns for Morse code
- Telegraph code
- TV Typewriter
- SI 960 (7-bit Hebrew ISO/IEC 646)
- Figure space (typographic unit equal to the size of a single typographic figure)
- Six-bit character code
- List of binary codes
