= Automatic data processing =

Automatic data processing (ADP) may refer to:

- Automatic Data Processing, a computing services company.
- Data processing using mechanical or electronic equipment, Electronic data processing
