= Six-bit character code =

Computer encoding of characters

A six-bit character code is a character encoding designed for use on computers with word lengths that are a multiple of 6. Six bits can only encode 64 distinct characters, so these codes generally include only the upper-case letters, the numerals, some punctuation characters, and sometimes control characters. The 7-track magnetic tape format was developed to store data in such codes, along with an additional parity bit.

== Types of six-bit codes ==
An early six-bit binary code was used for Braille, the reading system for the blind that was developed in the 1820s.

The earliest computers dealt with numeric data only, and made no provision for character data. Six-bit BCD, with several variants, was used by IBM on early computers such as the IBM 702 in 1953 and the IBM 704 in 1954. Six-bit encodings were replaced by the eight-bit EBCDIC code starting in 1964, when System/360 standardized on eight-bit bytes. There are some variants of this type of code (see below).

Six-bit character codes generally succeeded the five-bit Baudot code and preceded seven-bit ASCII.

Six-bit codes could encode more than 64 characters by the use of Shift Out and Shift In characters, essentially incorporating two distinct 62-character sets and switching between them. For example, the popular IBM 2741 communications terminal supported a variety of character sets of up to 88 printing characters plus control characters.

=== Teletypesetter code ===
A special six-level extension of the five-level International Telegraph Alphabet was used to remotely control Linotype machines beginning around 1930. By 1950 it was widely used by wire services to send preformatted news stories to participating newspapers. It supported the 90 printable characters of Linotype machines plus whitespace characters.

The TTS code had two pairs of shift codes, allowing a total of four shift states. The first operated much like a keyboard's shift key and selected between two repertoires, one lower-case and digits, and the other upper-case and symbols. A second pair of Linotype-specific "lower rail" and "upper rail" shift codes would select an alternate (usually italic) font.

=== BCD six-bit codes ===
Six-bit BCD codes were adaptations of the punched card code to binary code. IBM applied the terms binary-coded decimal and BCD to the variations of BCD alphamerics used in most early IBM computers, including the IBM 1620, IBM 1400 series, and non-decimal architecture members of the IBM 700/7000 series.

=== COBOL databases six-bit code ===
A six-bit code was also used in COBOL databases, where end-of-record information was stored separately.

=== Magnetic stripe card six-bit code ===
A six-bit code, with added odd parity bit, is used on Track 1 of magnetic stripe cards, as specified in ISO/IEC 7811-2.

=== DEC SIXBIT code ===
A popular six-bit code was DEC SIXBIT. This is simply the ASCII character codes from 32 to 95 coded as 0 to 63 by subtracting 32 (i.e., columns 2, 3, 4, and 5 of the ASCII table (16 characters to a column), shifted to columns 0 through 3, by subtracting 2 from the high bits); it includes the space, punctuation characters, numbers, and capital letters, but no control characters. Since it included no control characters, not even end-of-line, it was not used for general text processing. However, six-character names such as filenames and assembler symbols could be stored in a single 36-bit word of the PDP-10, and three characters fit in each word of the PDP-1 and two characters fit in each word of the PDP-8.

Another, less common, variant is obtained by just stripping the high bit of an ASCII code in 32 - 95 range (codes 32 - 63 remain at their positions, higher values have 64 subtracted from them). Such variant was sometimes used on DEC's PDP-8 (1965).

DEC SIXBIT
	0	1	2	3	4	5	6	7	8	9	A	B	C	D	E	F
0x	SP	!	"	#	$	%	&	'	(	)	*	+	,	-	.	/
1x	0	1	2	3	4	5	6	7	8	9	:	;	<	=	>	?
2x	@	A	B	C	D	E	F	G	H	I	J	K	L	M	N	O
3x	P	Q	R	S	T	U	V	W	X	Y	Z	[	\	]		_

=== ECMA and ISO six-bit code ===
A six-bit code similar to DEC's, but replacing a few punctuation characters with the most useful control characters—including SO/SI, allowing code extension—was specified as ECMA-1 in 1963. Four years later, ISO Recommendation R 646-1967 (which later evolved into ISO Standard 646) included an almost identical six-bit code, differing only in some of the alternative options permitted for a few characters. ECMA-1 was eventually withdrawn, and ISO 646-1973 explicitly removed the six-bit code, standardizing only its seven-bit code.

ECMA-1 and ISO/R 646:1967
	0	1	2	3	4	5	6	7	8	9	A	B	C	D	E	F
0x	SP	HT	LF (Note: In systems where LF both advances to the next line and returns the carriage to the start position, CR may instead be used as a "spare control" according to ECMA-1, and as BS "backspace" according to ISO/R 646. LF then has the designation NL "new line".)	VT	FF	CR	SO	SI	(	)	*	+	,	-	.	/
1x	0	1	2	3	4	5	6	7	8	9	:	;	</$	=/%	>/&	?/' (Note: ECMA-1 permits either the question mark or the apostrophe in this position. ISO/R 646 permits the apostrophe only, making it an invariant.)
2x	NUL	A	B	C	D	E	F	G	H	I	J	K	L	M	N	O
3x	P	Q	R	S	T	U	V	W	X	Y	Z	[ (Note: These character positions are intended for national use. Where the local alphabet contains letters additional to the basic latin alphabet, they should be assigned to these positions. The default assignments, according to ECMA-1, are listed here.)	\	]	ESC	DEL

=== ICT/ICL six-bit character set ===
The ICT (later ICL) 1900-series of mainframes used a six-bit code derived from an early 1963 version of ASCII for internal storage and processing, referred to as the "ECMA character set" in its documentation.

ICL Mainframes
	0	1	2	3	4	5	6	7	8	9	A	B	C	D	E	F
0x	0	1	2	3	4	5	6	7	8	9	:	;	<	=	>	?
1x	SP	!	"	#	£	%	&	'	(	)	*	+	,	-	.	/
2x	@	A	B	C	D	E	F	G	H	I	J	K	L	M	N	O
3x	P	Q	R	S	T	U	V	W	X	Y	Z	[	$	]	↑	←

=== AIS SixBit ASCII ===
The automatic identification system (AIS) uses this code in character strings within an encoded AIVDM/AIVDO payload.

AIS SixBit ASCII
	0	1	2	3	4	5	6	7	8	9	A	B	C	D	E	F
0x	@	A	B	C	D	E	F	G	H	I	J	K	L	M	N	O
1x	P	Q	R	S	T	U	V	W	X	Y	Z	[	\	]		_
2x	SP	!	"	#	$	%	&	'	(	)	*	+	,	-	.	/
3x	0	1	2	3	4	5	6	7	8	9	:	;	<	=	>	?

=== FIELDATA six-bit code ===
FIELDATA was a seven-bit code (with optional parity) of which only 64 code positions (occupying six bits) were formally defined. A variant was used by UNIVAC's 1100-series computers. Treating the code as a six-bit code these systems used a 36-bit word (capable of storing six such reduced FIELDATA characters).

=== Braille six-bit code ===
Braille characters are represented using six dot positions, arranged in a rectangle. Each position may contain a raised dot or not, so Braille can be considered to be a six-bit binary code. Some more modern Braille systems add an extra two dots, making these systems an eight-bit code instead.

== Six-bit codes for binary-to-text encoding ==
Transmission of binary data over systems which are designed for text only can sometimes introduce problems. For example, email historically supported only seven-bit ASCII codes and would strip the eighth bit, thus corrupting binary data sent directly through any troublesome mail server. Other systems can cause issues by improperly interpreting control characters during storage or transmission. A number of schemes exist to pack eight-bit data into text-only representations which can pass through text mail systems, to be decoded at the destination. Examples of six-bit character subsets used for packing binary data include Uuencode and Base64. These sets contain no control characters (only printable numbers, letters, some punctuation, and maybe space) and allow data to be transmitted over any medium which is also able to transmit human-readable text.

== Examples of BCD six-bit codes ==
IBM, which dominated commercial data processing use a variety of six-bit codes, which were tied to the character set used on punched cards, see BCD (character encoding).

Other vendor character codes are shown below, with their Unicode equivalents.

CDC 1604: Magnetic tape BCD codes
	0	1	2	3	4	5	6	7	8	9	A	B	C	D	E	F
0x		1	2	3	4	5	6	7	8	9	0	#	@			TAPE; MARK
1x	SP	/	S	T	U	V	W	X	Y	Z	REC; MARK	,	%			
2x	-	J	K	L	M	N	O	P	Q	R	-0	$	*			
3x	&	A	B	C	D	E	F	G	H	I	+0	.	¤			GRP; MARK

CDC 1604: Punched card codes
	0	1	2	3	4	5	6	7	8	9	A	B	C	D	E	F
0x		1	2	3	4	5	6	7	8	9	0	=	−			
1x	SP	/	S	T	U	V	W	X	Y	Z		,	(			
2x	—	J	K	L	M	N	O	P	Q	R	-0	$	*			
3x	+	A	B	C	D	E	F	G	H	I	+0	.	)			

CDC 1612: Printer codes (business applications)
	0	1	2	3	4	5	6	7	8	9	A	B	C	D	E	F
0x	:	1	2	3	4	5	6	7	8	9	0	=	≠	≤	!	[
1x	SP	/	S	T	U	V	W	X	Y	Z	]	,	(	→	≡	~
2x	−	J	K	L	M	N	O	P	Q	R	%	$	*	↑	↓	>
3x	+	A	B	C	D	E	F	G	H	I	<	.	)	≥	?	;

== GOST 6-bit code ==
GOST 6-bit code
	0	1	2	3	4	5	6	7	8	9	A	B	C	D	E	F
0x	0	1	2	3	4	5	6	7	8	9	+	-	/	,	.	SP
1x	⏨	↑	(	)	×	=	;	[	]	*	‘	’	≠	<	>	:
2x	А	Б	В	Г	Д	Е	Ж	З	И	Й	К	Л	М	Н	О	П
3x	Р	С	Т	У	Ф	Х	Ц	Ч	Ш	Щ	Ы	Ь	Э	Ю	Я	DEL

== Example of six-bit Braille codes ==
The following table shows the arrangement of characters, with the hex value, corresponding ASCII character, Braille six-bit codes (dot combinations), Braille Unicode glyph, and general meaning (the actual meaning may change depending on context).

Hex	ASCII Glyph	Braille Dots	Braille Glyph	Braille Meaning
20	(space)		⠀ (braille pattern blank)	(space)
21	!	2-3-4-6	⠮ (braille pattern dots-2346)	the
22	"	5	⠐ (braille pattern dots-5)	(contraction)
23	#	3-4-5-6	⠼ (braille pattern dots-3456)	(number prefix)
24	$	1-2-4-6	⠫ (braille pattern dots-1246)	ed
25	%	1-4-6	⠩ (braille pattern dots-146)	sh
26	&	1-2-3-4-6	⠯ (braille pattern dots-12346)	and
27	'	3	⠄ (braille pattern dots-3)	'
28	(	1-2-3-5-6	⠷ (braille pattern dots-12356)	of
29	)	2-3-4-5-6	⠾ (braille pattern dots-23456)	with
2A	*	1-6	⠡ (braille pattern dots-16)	ch
2B	+	3-4-6	⠬ (braille pattern dots-346)	ing
2C	,	6	⠠ (braille pattern dots-6)	(uppercase prefix)
2D	-	3-6	⠤ (braille pattern dots-36)	-
2E	.	4-6	⠨ (braille pattern dots-46)	(italic prefix)
2F	/	3-4	⠌ (braille pattern dots-34)	st
30	0	3-5-6	⠴ (braille pattern dots-356)	"
31	1	2	⠂ (braille pattern dots-2)	,
32	2	2-3	⠆ (braille pattern dots-23)	;
33	3	2-5	⠒ (braille pattern dots-25)	:
34	4	2-5-6	⠲ (braille pattern dots-256)	.
35	5	2-6	⠢ (braille pattern dots-26)	en
36	6	2-3-5	⠖ (braille pattern dots-235)	!
37	7	2-3-5-6	⠶ (braille pattern dots-2356)	( or )
38	8	2-3-6	⠦ (braille pattern dots-236)	" or ?
39	9	3-5	⠔ (braille pattern dots-35)	in
3A	:	1-5-6	⠱ (braille pattern dots-156)	wh
3B	;	5-6	⠰ (braille pattern dots-56)	(letter prefix)
3C	<	1-2-6	⠣ (braille pattern dots-126)	gh
3D	=	1-2-3-4-5-6	⠿ (braille pattern dots-123456)	for
3E	>	3-4-5	⠜ (braille pattern dots-345)	ar
3F	?	1-4-5-6	⠹ (braille pattern dots-1456)	th

Hex	ASCII Glyph	Braille Dots	Braille Glyph	Braille Meaning
40	@	4	⠈ (braille pattern dots-4)	(accent prefix)
41	A	1	⠁ (braille pattern dots-1)	a
42	B	1-2	⠃ (braille pattern dots-12)	b
43	C	1-4	⠉ (braille pattern dots-14)	c
44	D	1-4-5	⠙ (braille pattern dots-145)	d
45	E	1-5	⠑ (braille pattern dots-15)	e
46	F	1-2-4	⠋ (braille pattern dots-124)	f
47	G	1-2-4-5	⠛ (braille pattern dots-1245)	g
48	H	1-2-5	⠓ (braille pattern dots-125)	h
49	I	2-4	⠊ (braille pattern dots-24)	i
4A	J	2-4-5	⠚ (braille pattern dots-245)	j
4B	K	1-3	⠅ (braille pattern dots-13)	k
4C	L	1-2-3	⠇ (braille pattern dots-123)	l
4D	M	1-3-4	⠍ (braille pattern dots-134)	m
4E	N	1-3-4-5	⠝ (braille pattern dots-1345)	n
4F	O	1-3-5	⠕ (braille pattern dots-135)	o
50	P	1-2-3-4	⠏ (braille pattern dots-1234)	p
51	Q	1-2-3-4-5	⠟ (braille pattern dots-12345)	q
52	R	1-2-3-5	⠗ (braille pattern dots-1235)	r
53	S	2-3-4	⠎ (braille pattern dots-234)	s
54	T	2-3-4-5	⠞ (braille pattern dots-2345)	t
55	U	1-3-6	⠥ (braille pattern dots-136)	u
56	V	1-2-3-6	⠧ (braille pattern dots-1236)	v
57	W	2-4-5-6	⠺ (braille pattern dots-2456)	w
58	X	1-3-4-6	⠭ (braille pattern dots-1346)	x
59	Y	1-3-4-5-6	⠽ (braille pattern dots-13456)	y
5A	Z	1-3-5-6	⠵ (braille pattern dots-1356)	z
5B	[	2-4-6	⠪ (braille pattern dots-246)	ow
5C	\	1-2-5-6	⠳ (braille pattern dots-1256)	ou
5D	]	1-2-4-5-6	⠻ (braille pattern dots-12456)	er
5E		4-5	⠘ (braille pattern dots-45)	(contraction)
5F	_	4-5-6	⠸ (braille pattern dots-456)	(contraction)

== See also ==
- Binary-coded decimal
- BCD (character encoding)
- CDC display code
- DEC RADIX 50 / MOD40
- IBM SQUOZE
- IBM Transcode
- ASCII
- Baudot code
- EBCDIC
- Unicode
- ANSI X3.64
- UTF-8
- UTF-16
- Teletypesetter code (TTS)
