= RY Tauri =

Star in the constellation Taurus

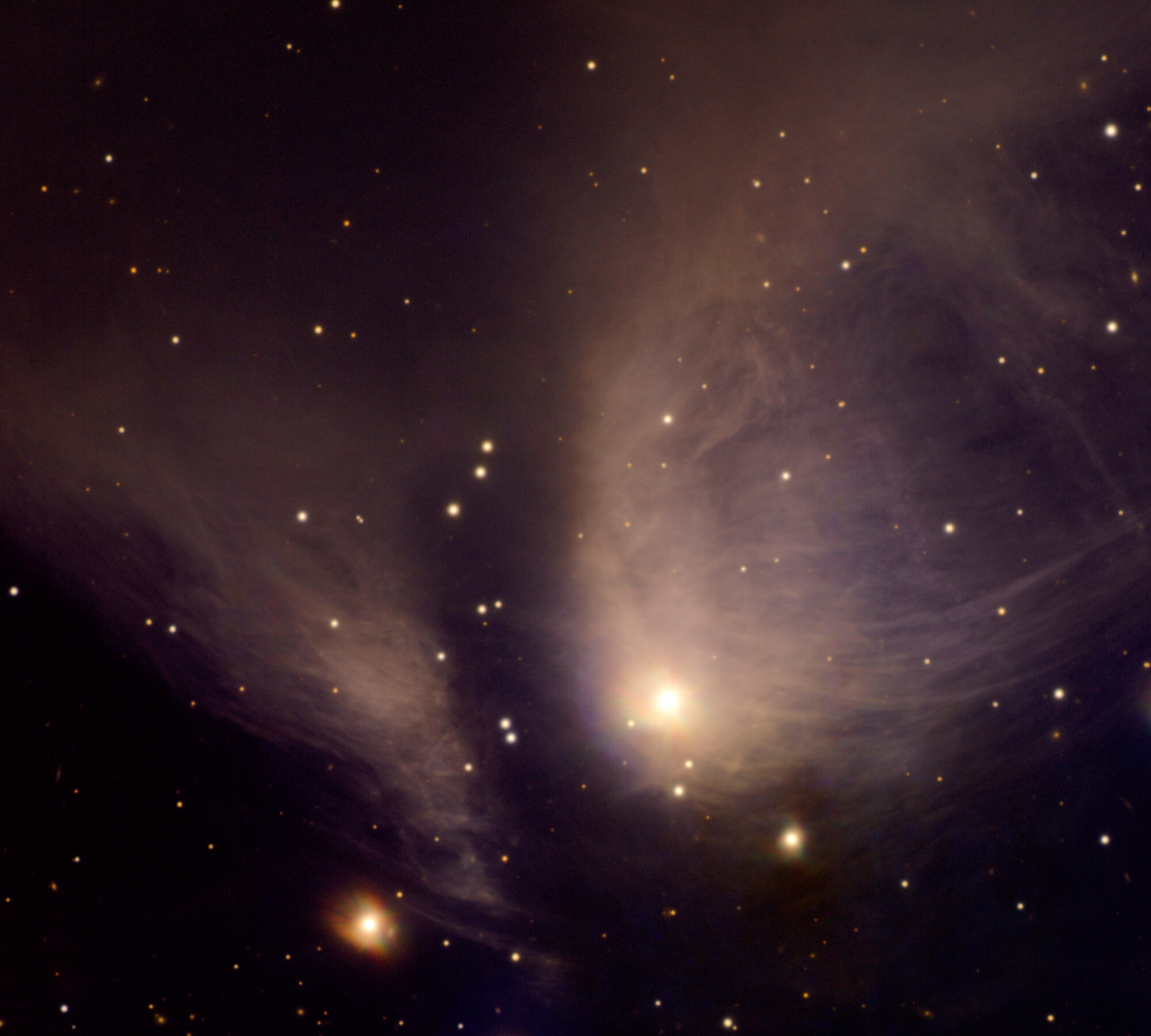
- Nebula around RY Tauri observed with Gemini

Observation data Epoch J2000 Equinox ICRS
- Constellation: Taurus
- Right ascension: 04^{h} 21^{m} 57.4133^{s}
- Declination: +28° 26′ 35.534″
- Apparent magnitude (V): 9.5 - 11.5

Characteristics
- Evolutionary stage: pre-main-sequence star
- Spectral type: F7
- Apparent magnitude (G): 10.706
- Variable type: T Tau

Astrometry
| Radial velocity (R_{v}) | 24.3±1.9 km/s |
| Proper motion (μ) | RA: 8.744 mas/yr Dec.: −27.002 mas/yr |
| Parallax (π) | 7.2349±0.2031 mas |
| Distance | 450 ± 10 ly (138 ± 4 pc) |
| Absolute magnitude (M_{V}) | +2.11 (at magnitude 9.55) |

Position (relative to RY Tauri)
| Component | 2MASS J04215810+2826300 |
| Angular distance | 10.83″ |
| Position angle | 122.41° |
| Projected separation | 1500 AU |

Details
| Mass | 1.95+0.10 −0.17 M_{☉} |
| Radius | 3.2 R_{☉} |
| Luminosity | 11.6 L_{☉} |
| Surface gravity (log g) | 3.70±0.21 cgs |
| Temperature | 5,495±143 K |
| Metallicity [Fe/H] | 0.32±0.28 dex |
| Rotation | 2.97+0.88 −0.55 days |
| Rotational velocity (v sin i) | 50±2 km/s |
| Age | 4.29+1.43 −0.89 Myr |

Other designations
- BD+28 645, HD 283571, HIP 20387, TYC 1828-129-1, GSC 01828-00129, 2MASS J04215740+2826355, Gaia DR2 164551162164119424

Database references
| SIMBAD | data |

RY Tauri is a young T Tauri star in the constellation of Taurus about 450 light years away, belonging to the Taurus Molecular Cloud. It is more massive than typical T Tauri stars, and may be an intermediate between this class and the Herbig Ae/Be star type.

== Stellar system ==
There was one suspected stellar companion to RY Tauri, a 14.81 magnitude object 2MASS J04215810+2826300 discovered in 2008 at a projected separation of 1500 AU. It was proven to be a background star not related to RY Tauri with Gaia data though.

== Protoplanetary system ==
The star is surrounded by a protoplanetary disk discovered in 2006. The disk is massive at 0.3M_{☉} and consists mostly of gas. The existence of a protoplanetary disk is disputed; the signal can also be attributed to the birth envelope partially disrupted by the young star. Also, polar jets were detected. The jets contain detectable amounts of oxygen and sulfur. A superjovian planet on a 0.2 AU orbit is suspected since 2021.

The planetary system
| Companion (in order from star) | Mass | Semimajor axis (AU) | Orbital period (days) | Eccentricity | Inclination (°) | Radius |
|---|---|---|---|---|---|---|
| protoplanetary disk | 0.21–80 AU | | | | 65° | — |

== Variability ==
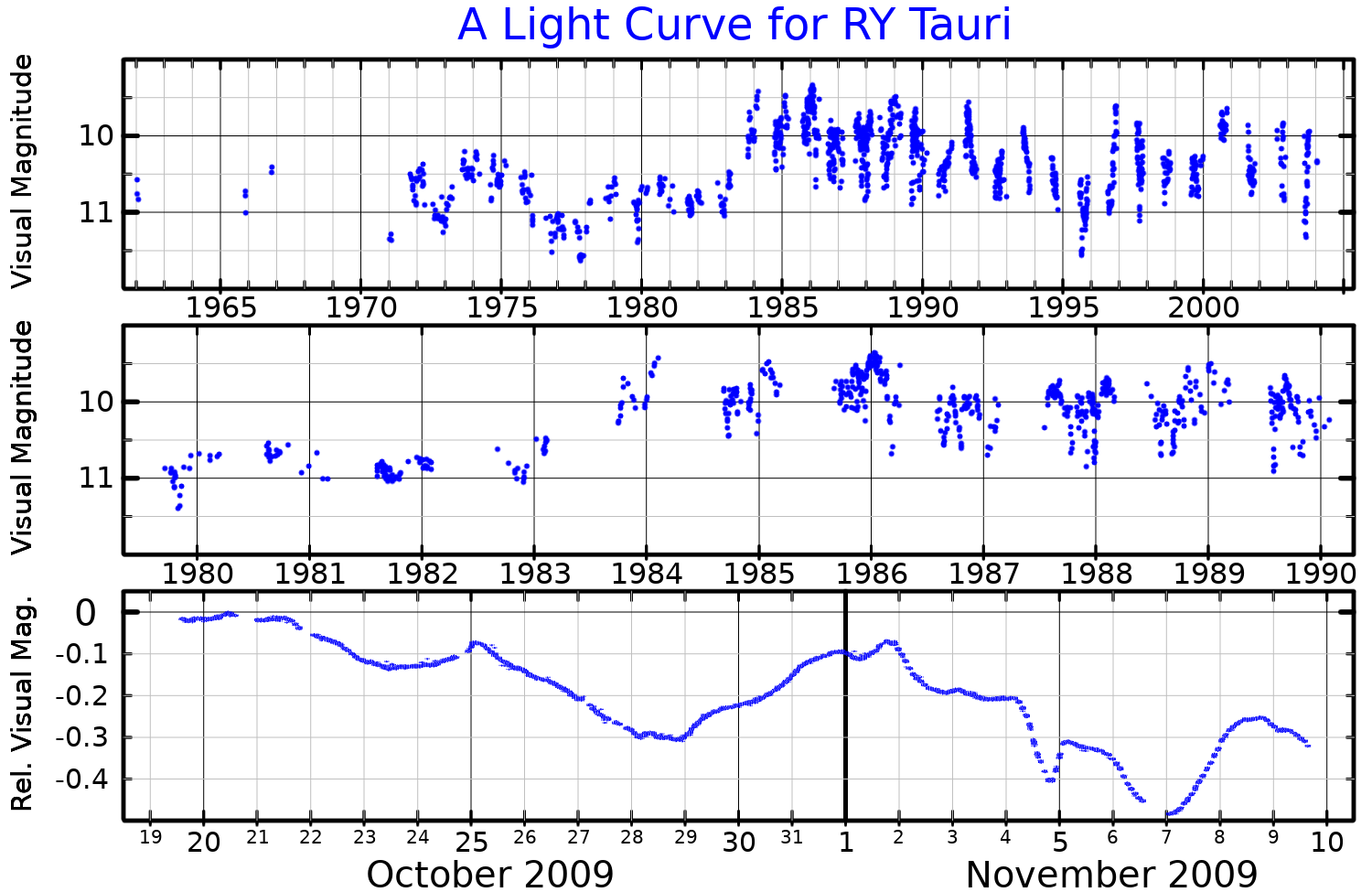
A visual band light curve for RY Tauri, shawing variability on three different time scales, adapted from Ismailov and Adygezalzade (2012), Ismailov et al. (2011) and Siwak et al. (2011)

Henrietta Swan Leavitt's discovery that RY Tauri is a variable star was reported in 1907. It is a highly (by 1.5 magnitudes) obscured Orion variable, producing fluctuations of brightness as the star shines through the inhomogeneities of the inner part of the protoplanetary disk. It also produces irregular brightening events with a duration of about a month and amplitude of one magnitude. The light curve of RY Tauri varies by 2-3 magnitudes over a decade and by roughly one magnitude over a year. The star was gradually brightening during the 20th century, possibly changing the variability mechanism in the process.
