= CDC display code =

Computer 6-bit character code

Display code is the six-bit character code used by many computer systems manufactured by Control Data Corporation, notably the CDC 6000 series in 1964, the 7600 in 1967 and the following Cyber series in 1971. The CDC 6000 series and their successors had 60 bit words. As such, typical usage packed 10 characters per word. It is a six-bit extension of the four-bit BCD encoding, and was referred to as BCDIC (BCD interchange code.)

== Overview ==
There were several variations of display code, notably the 63-character character set, and the 64-character character set. There were also 'CDC graphic' and 'ASCII graphic' variants of both the 63- and 64-character sets. The choice between 63- or 64-character character set, and between CDC or ASCII graphic was site-selectable. Generally, early CDC customers started out with the 63-character character set, and CDC graphic print trains on their line printers. As time-sharing became prevalent, almost all sites used the ASCII variant - so that line printer output would match interactive usage. Later CDC customers were also more likely to use the 64-character character set.

A later variation, called 6/12 display code, was used in the Kronos and NOS timesharing systems in order to support full ASCII capabilities. In 6/12 mode, an escape character (the circumflex, octal 76) would indicate that the following letter was lower case. Thus, upper case and other characters were 6 bits in length, and lower case characters were 12 bits in length.

The PLATO system used a further variant of 6/12 display code. Noting that lower case letters were most common in typical PLATO usage, the roles were reversed. Lower case letters were the norm, and the escape character preceded upper case letters.

The typical text file format used a zero-byte terminator to signify the end of each record. The zero-byte terminator was indicated by, at least, the final twelve bits of a 60-bit word being set to zero. The terminator could actually be anywhere from 12- to 66-bits long - depending on the length of the record. This caused an ambiguity in the 64-character character set, when a colon character needed to be the final character in a record. In such cases a blank character was typically appended to the record after the trailing colon.

== Display code characters ==
=== 64-character character set version ===
			ASCII	CDC	
Binary	Decimal	Octal	Graphic	Graphic	Name
000 000	0	00	:	:	colon
000 001	1	01	A	A	
000 010	2	02	B	B	
000 011	3	03	C	C	
000 100	4	04	D	D	
000 101	5	05	E	E	
000 110	6	06	F	F	
000 111	7	07	G	G	
001 000	8	10	H	H	
001 001	9	11	I	I	
001 010	10	12	J	J	
001 011	11	13	K	K	
001 100	12	14	L	L	
001 101	13	15	M	M	
001 110	14	16	N	N	
001 111	15	17	O	O	
010 000	16	20	P	P	
010 001	17	21	Q	Q	
010 010	18	22	R	R	
010 011	19	23	S	S	
010 100	20	24	T	T	
010 101	21	25	U	U	
010 110	22	26	V	V	
010 111	23	27	W	W	
011 000	24	30	X	X	
011 001	25	31	Y	Y	
011 010	26	32	Z	Z	
011 011	27	33	0	0	
011 100	28	34	1	1	
011 101	29	35	2	2	
011 110	30	36	3	3	
011 111	31	37	4	4	

			ASCII	CDC	
Binary	Decimal	Octal	Graphic	Graphic	Name
100 000	32	40	5	5	
100 001	33	41	6	6	
100 010	34	42	7	7	
100 011	35	43	8	8	
100 100	36	44	9	9	
100 101	37	45	+	+	
100 110	38	46	-	-	
100 111	39	47	*	*	
101 000	40	50	/	/	
101 001	41	51	(	(	
101 010	42	52	)	)	
101 011	43	53	$	$	
101 100	44	54	=	=	
101 101	45	55			blank
101 110	46	56	,	,	
101 111	47	57	.	.	
110 000	48	60	#	≡	equiv
110 001	49	61	[	[	
110 010	50	62	]	]	
110 011	51	63	%	%	
110 100	52	64	"	≠	not eq
110 101	53	65	_	→	concat
110 110	54	66	!	∨	log OR
110 111	55	67	&	∧	log AND
111 000	56	70	'	↑	super
111 001	57	71	?	↓	sub
111 010	58	72	<	<	
111 011	59	73	>	>	
111 100	60	74	@	≤	
111 101	61	75	\	≥	
111 110	62	76	^	¬	NOT
111 111	63	77	;	;	

=== 6/12 display code ===
The NOS 6/12 display code is one of the character sets used on CDC Cyber NOS computers to represent all ASCII characters.

ASCII			display code		
Dec	Hex	Abbr	Dec	Oct	6/12
0	00	NUL	62 32	76 40	^5
1	01	SOH	62 33	76 41	^6
2	02	STX	62 34	76 42	^7
3	03	ETX	62 35	76 43	^8
4	04	EOT	62 36	76 44	^9
5	05	ENQ	62 37	76 45	^+
6	06	ACK	62 38	76 46	^-
7	07	BEL	62 39	76 47	^*
8	08	BS	62 40	76 50	^/
9	09	HT	62 41	76 51	^(
10	0A	LF	62 42	76 52	^)
11	0B	VT	62 43	76 53	^$
12	0C	FF	62 44	76 54	^=
13	0D	CR	62 45	76 55	^
14	0E	SO	62 46	76 56	^,
15	0F	SI	62 47	76 57	^.
16	10	DLE	62 48	76 60	^#
17	11	DC1	62 49	76 61	^[
18	12	DC2	62 50	76 62	^]
19	13	DC3	62 51	76 63	^%
20	14	DC4	62 52	76 64	^"
21	15	NAK	62 53	76 65	^_
22	16	SYN	62 54	76 66	^!
23	17	ETB	62 55	76 67	^&
24	18	CAN	62 56	76 70	^'
25	19	EM	62 57	76 71	^?
26	1A	SUB	62 58	76 72	^<
27	1B	ESC	62 59	76 73	^>
28	1C	FS	62 60	76 74	^@
29	1D	GS	62 61	76 75	^\
30	1E	RS	62 62	76 76	^^
31	1F	US	62 63	76 77	^;

ASCII			display code		
Dec	Hex	Glyph	Dec	Oct	6/12
32	20		45	55	
33	21	!	54	66	!
34	22	"	52	64	"
35	23	#	48	60	#
36	24	$	43	53	$
37	25	%	51	63	%
38	26	&	55	67	&
39	27	'	56	70	'
40	28	(	41	51	(
41	29	)	42	52	)
42	2A	*	39	47	*
43	2B	+	37	45	+
44	2C	,	46	56	,
45	2D	-	38	46	-
46	2E	.	47	57	.
47	2F	/	40	50	/
48	30	0	27	33	0
49	31	1	28	34	1
50	32	2	29	35	2
51	33	3	30	36	3
52	34	4	31	37	4
53	35	5	32	40	5
54	36	6	33	41	6
55	37	7	34	42	7
56	38	8	35	43	8
57	39	9	36	44	9
58	3A	:	60 4	74 04	@D
59	3B	;	63	77	;
60	3C	<	58	72	<
61	3D	=	44	54	=
62	3E	>	59	73	>
63	3F	?	57	71	?

ASCII			display code		
Dec	Hex	Glyph	Dec	Oct	6/12
64	40	@	60 1	74 01	@A
65	41	A	1	01	A
66	42	B	2	02	B
67	43	C	3	03	C
68	44	D	4	04	D
69	45	E	5	05	E
70	46	F	6	06	F
71	47	G	7	07	G
72	48	H	8	10	H
73	49	I	9	11	I
74	4A	J	10	12	J
75	4B	K	11	13	K
76	4C	L	12	14	L
77	4D	M	13	15	M
78	4E	N	14	16	N
79	4F	O	15	17	O
80	50	P	16	20	P
81	51	Q	17	21	Q
82	52	R	18	22	R
83	53	S	19	23	S
84	54	T	20	24	T
85	55	U	21	25	U
86	56	V	22	26	V
87	57	W	23	27	W
88	58	X	24	30	X
89	59	Y	25	31	Y
90	5A	Z	26	32	Z
91	5B	[	49	61	[
92	5C	\	61	75	\
93	5D	]	50	62	]
94	5E		60 2	74 02	@B
95	5F	_	53	65	_

ASCII			display code		
Dec	Hex	Glyph	Dec	Oct	6/12
96	60	'	60 7	74 07	@G
97	61	a	62 1	76 01	^A
98	62	b	62 2	76 02	^B
99	63	c	62 3	76 03	^C
100	64	d	62 4	76 04	^D
101	65	e	62 5	76 05	^E
102	66	f	62 6	76 06	^F
103	67	g	62 7	76 07	^G
104	68	h	62 8	76 10	^H
105	69	i	62 9	76 11	^I
106	6A	j	62 10	76 12	^J
107	6B	k	62 11	76 13	^K
108	6C	l	62 12	76 14	^L
109	6D	m	62 13	76 15	^M
110	6E	n	62 14	76 16	^N
111	6F	o	62 15	76 17	^O
112	70	p	62 16	76 20	^P
113	71	q	62 17	76 21	^Q
114	72	r	62 18	76 22	^R
115	73	s	62 19	76 23	^S
116	74	t	62 20	76 24	^T
117	75	u	62 21	76 25	^U
118	76	v	62 22	76 26	^V
119	77	w	62 23	76 27	^W
120	78	x	62 24	76 30	^X
121	79	y	62 25	76 31	^Y
122	7A	z	62 26	76 32	^Z
123	7B	{	62 27	76 33	^0
124	7C	|	62 28	76 34	^1
125	7D	}	62 29	76 35	^2
126	7E	~	62 30	76 36	^3
127	7F	DEL	62 31	76 37	^4
