= RY (test signal) =

Letters used to test 5-level teleprinters

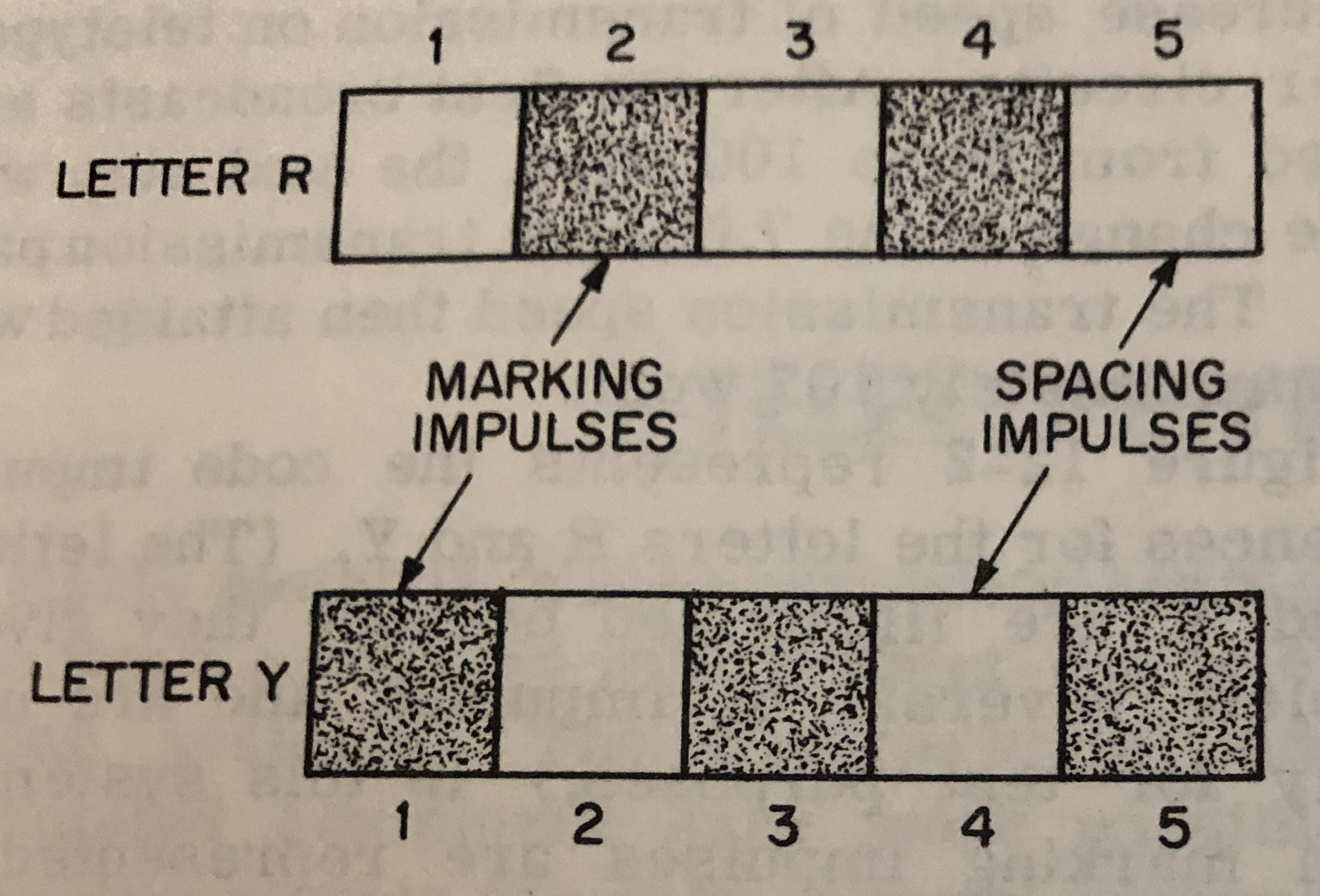
RY test pattern in 5-level ITA2 code

RYRYRYRY... is a character string that was widely used to test a five-level teleprinter or RTTY channel. The characters R and Y are "01010" and "10101" in 5-bit ITA2 code, also known as Baudot. Thus they are Boolean complements of each other.

Switching between the two characters is a stressful test for electromechanical teleprinters. Repeated over and over, RYRYRYRY... outputs a carrier wave that regularly and rapidly shifts back and forth in frequency.

Test tapes were easily made with a repeating RY sequence. These were used by technicians to align the bias adjustment on equipment such as the 43A1 carrier channel terminal

This signal pattern also provided a test for signal polarity; if polarity was reversed, the test signal would print as "SG".

The corresponding string of complementary characters in 7-bit ASCII is U*U*U*U*...

The RYRYRY sequence usage can be seen on the following DDH47 weather station broadcast excerpt:

 CQ CQ CQ DE DDH47 DDH9 DDH8
 FREQUENCIES   147.3 kHz   11039 kHz   14467.3 kHz
 RYRYRYRYRYRYRYRYRYRYRYRYRYRYRYRYRYRYRYRYRYRYRYRYRYRYRYRYRYRYRYRY
 CQ CQ CQ DE DDH47 DDH9 DDH8
 FREQUENCIES   147.3 kHz   11039 kHz   14467.3 kHz
 RYRYRYRYRYRYRYRYRYRYRYRYRYRYRYRYRYRYRYRYRYRYRYRYRYRYRYRYRYRYRYRY
 CQ CQ CQ DE DDH47 DDH9 DDH8
 FREQUENCIES   147.3 kHz   11039 kHz   14467.3 kHz
 RYRYRYRYRYRYRYRYRYRYRYRYRYRYRYRYRYRYRYRYRYRYRYRYRYRYRYRYRYRYRYRY
 ZCZC 643     
 WWXX60 EDZW 150900
 NAUTISCHE WARNNACHRICHTEN VOM 15.09.2017 UM 09 UTC
 STRONGWIND GALE STORMWARNINGS FOR GERMAN BIGHT AND BALTIC SEA
 STARKWIND STURMWARNUNGEN FUER NORD UND OSTSEE
 NO WARNINGS IN FORCE
 KEINE WARNUNGEN IN KRAFT
