= Trần Thị Hoa Ry =

Vietnamese politician

Trần Thị Hoa Ry (born 11 April 1976) is a representative in the Twelfth Vietnamese National Assembly. A Buddhist and member of the Khmer ethnic minority, Hoa Ry was born in Hưng Hội village, Vĩnh Lợi District, Bạc Liêu Province. She was accepted into the Communist Party of Việt Nam on 3 March 1997, though she has still not been made an official member.
