= ICT 1301 =

1960s mainframe computer

The ICT 1301 and its smaller derivative ICT 1300 were early business computers from International Computers and Tabulators. Typical of mid-sized machines of the era, they used core memory, drum storage and punched cards, but they were unusual in that they were based on decimal logic instead of binary.

== Description ==
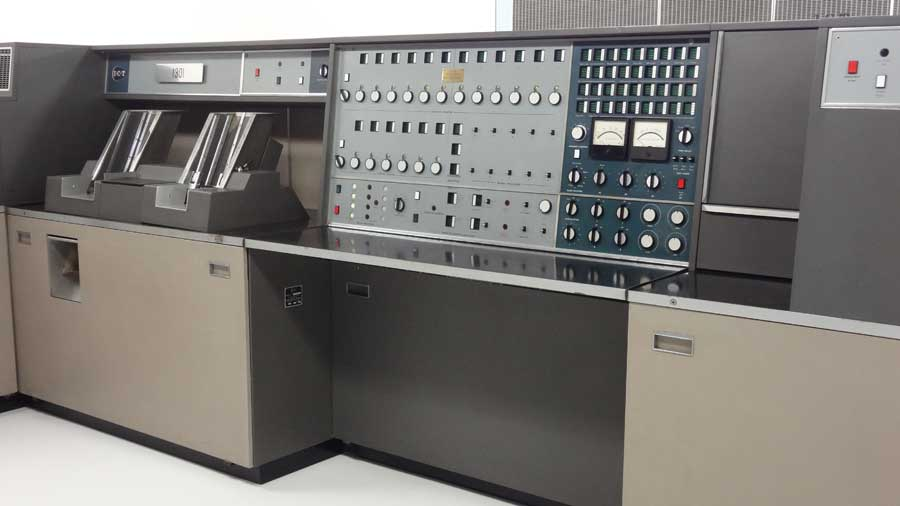
Example ICT 1301 Installation.

The 1301 was the main machine in the line. Its main memory came in increments of 400 words of 48 bits (12 decimal digits or 12 four-bit binary values, 0–15) plus two parity bits. The maximum size was 4,000 words. It was the first ICT machine to use core memory.

Backing store was magnetic drum and optionally one-inch-, half-inch- or quarter-inch-wide magnetic tape. Input was from 80-column punched cards and optionally 160-column punched cards and punched paper tape. Output was to 80-column punched cards, line printer, and optionally to punched paper tape.

The machine ran at a clock speed of 1 MHz and its arithmetic logic unit (ALU) operated on data in a serial-parallel fashion—the 48-bit words were processed sequentially four bits at a time. A simple addition took 21 clock cycles; hardware multiplication averaged 170 clock cycles per digit; and division was performed in software.

A typical 1301 requires 700 square feet (65 square metres) of floor space and weighs about 5.5 short tons (5.0 t). It consumes about 13kVA of three-phase electric power. The electronics consist of over 4,000 printed circuit boards each with many germanium diodes (mainly OA5), germanium transistors (mainly Mullard GET872), resistors, capacitors, inductors, and a handful of thermionic valves and a few dozen relays operated when buttons were pressed. Integrated circuits were not available commercially at the time.

== History ==
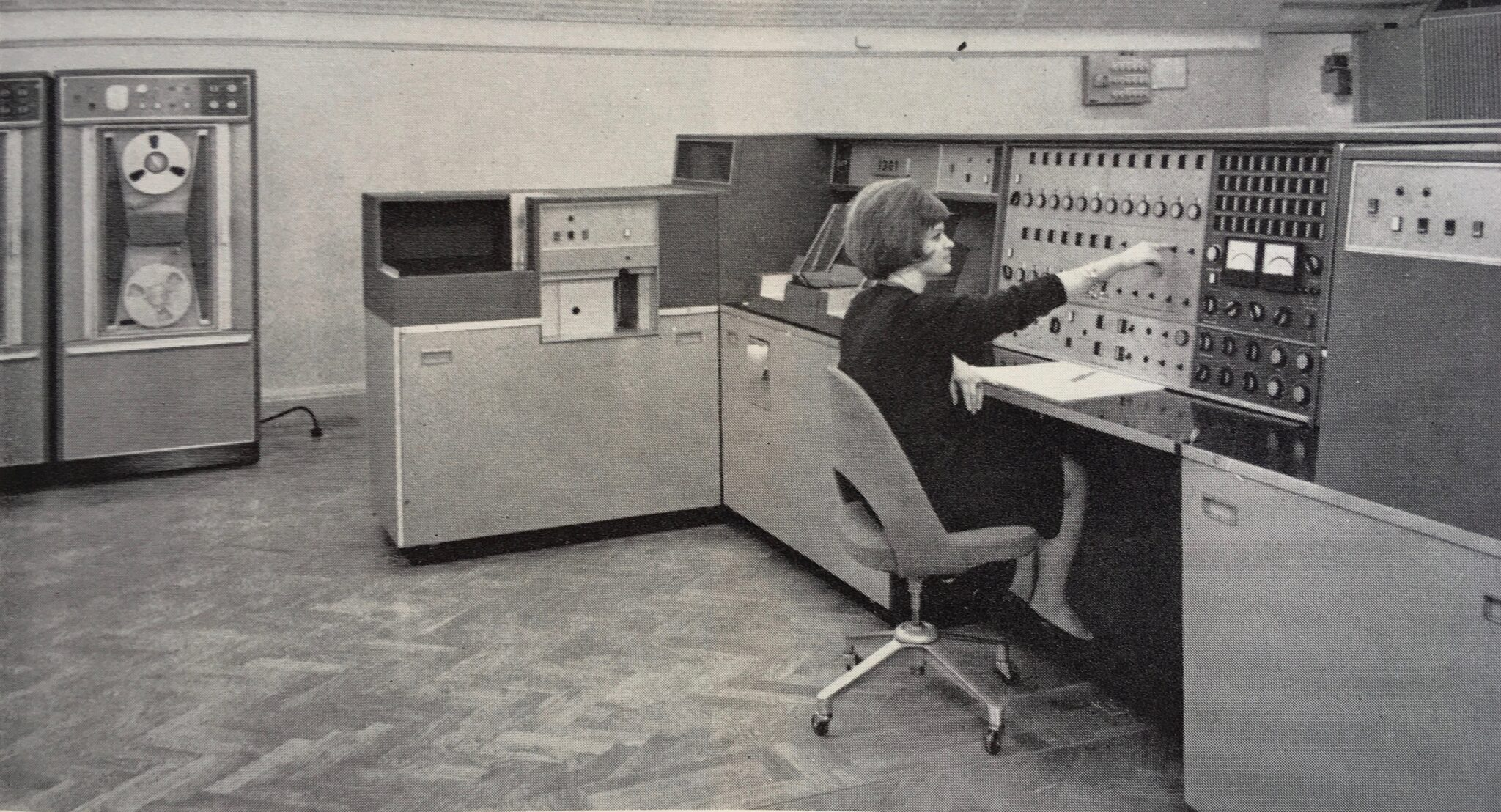
An ICT 1301 being used at Skandinaviska banken, Gothenburg 1962.

The 1301 was designed by an ICT and GEC joint subsidiary, Computer Developments Limited (CDL) at GEC's Coventry site formed in 1956. CDL was taken over by ICT, but the 1301 was built at the GEC site as ICT lacked the manufacturing capability at that time.

The computer was announced in May 1960, though development had started much earlier. The first customer delivery was in 1962, a 1301 sold to the University of London. One of their main attractions was that they performed British currency calculations (pounds, shillings and pence) in hardware. They also had the advantage of programmers not having to learn binary or octal arithmetic as the instruction set was pure decimal and the arithmetic unit had no binary mode, only decimal or pounds, shillings and pence. The London University machine was restored to working condition by a group of enthusiasts completing their task in 2012.

Over 200 computers in the range were delivered, making it the best selling second generation British computer. Had the development been faster, it would have had more commercial potential.

== Peripherals ==
=== Standard ===
The card reader could read 600 standard punched cards per minute, each with a capacity of up to 80 characters. The card punch could punch 100 cards per minute.

The line printer could print 600 lines of 120 characters per minute. It used a print barrel made up of 120 print wheels each with 50 characters around its edge. Each of the 120 print positions had a print hammer which when fired squeezed the paper and an inked ribbon between itself and the rotating print barrel for a fraction of a second. It is reputed to be the first commercially produced barrel printer.

A drum could record 12,000 words of data. It also had 400 words of 'reserved' storage where the computer's bootstrap program (then called Initial Orders) was stored. Up to 8 drums could be attached. Average access time was 5.7 ms.

=== Optional ===
The standard magnetic tape system (called tape type 3) used half-inch-wide (12.7 mm) magnetic tape with ten tracks at a density of 300 bits per inch. Four of the tracks held data, four more tracks held the inverse of the data and there was a parity bit for both groups of four. This allowed single-bit errors to be corrected and double-bit errors to be detected. Up to eight Ampex TM4 tape decks, running at 75 inches per second for a throughput of 22,500 digits per second, could be connected. Spools could hold up to 3,600 feet (1,100 m) of tape and were of the three-prong design common at the time for professional audio recorders rather than the later industry standard expanding-hub design.

The "High Speed" magnetic tape system (called tape type 1) used one-inch-wide (25.4 mm) magnetic tape running at 150 inches per second, with sixteen tracks at a density of 300 bits per inch. Eight of the tracks held data, with check data on the other eight, allowing single-bit errors to be corrected and double-bit errors to be detected. Up to eight tape decks could be connected, giving a throughput of 90,000 digits per second. Spools could hold up to 3,600 feet (1,100 m) of tape and were of three-prong design.

There was also a system based on quarter-inch magnetic tape. This had a single write head and two read heads. The read heads were identical but each read from half of the width of the tape.

Each digit was represented by two flux-reversal portions on the tape. The length of these segments determined the value of each digit. This meant that tape capacity was somewhat data dependent. The offcuts from damaged tape were compatible with the then normal audio tape recorders so there was a great deal of recycling.

One or two paper-tape readers could be connected, each with a speed of 1,000 characters per second.

A paper-tape punch of 300 characters per second was available.

An online teleprinter was available, though very few machines had these.

Towards the end of the life of the 1301, a single ICT standard interface could be added to allow data to be written to the by-then industry-standard magnetic tape.

== ICT 1300 ==
The ICT 1300 was identical to the 1301 in every way except that its card reader was limited to 300 cards per minute and its line printer was limited to 300 lines per minute. It tended to be sold with less core storage and drum storage and without magnetic tape. A drum with only a quarter of the read/write heads fitted was commonly used, giving 3,000 words of 48 bits as backing storage.

== ICT 1302 ==
The ICT 1302 was a larger version of the 1301 with the new ICT standard interface for connecting peripheral devices (the standard interface was later used on the ICT 1900 series).

== Existing and restored ICT 1301s ==
Very few ICT 1301 computers remain in existence around the world, and of them, none is working.

"Flossie" is the nickname given to an ICT 1301 (as of 2013) in storage at The National Museum of Computing at Bletchley Park, England. The computer had originally been used for computing exam results for students at the University of London. After being restored and demonstrated in 2012, it was shut down and put in storage, and is to be restored again to operating condition.

A second ICT 1301, which is close to operating condition, is on display at the Toitū Otago Settlers Museum in Dunedin, New Zealand. This computer — the first in the city of Dunedin — was originally used by the Cadbury confectionery factory for calculating invoices and payroll.

There is a third machine named Arthur located in Cumbria, UK. The machine belongs to the Time-Line Computer Archive museum and although nearly complete, is not in working condition.
