= EMIDEC 1100 =

- Manufacturer: EMI
- Released: 1959
- Units sold: 24
- Memory: 4k
- Storage: 20k
- Successor: EMIDEC 2400

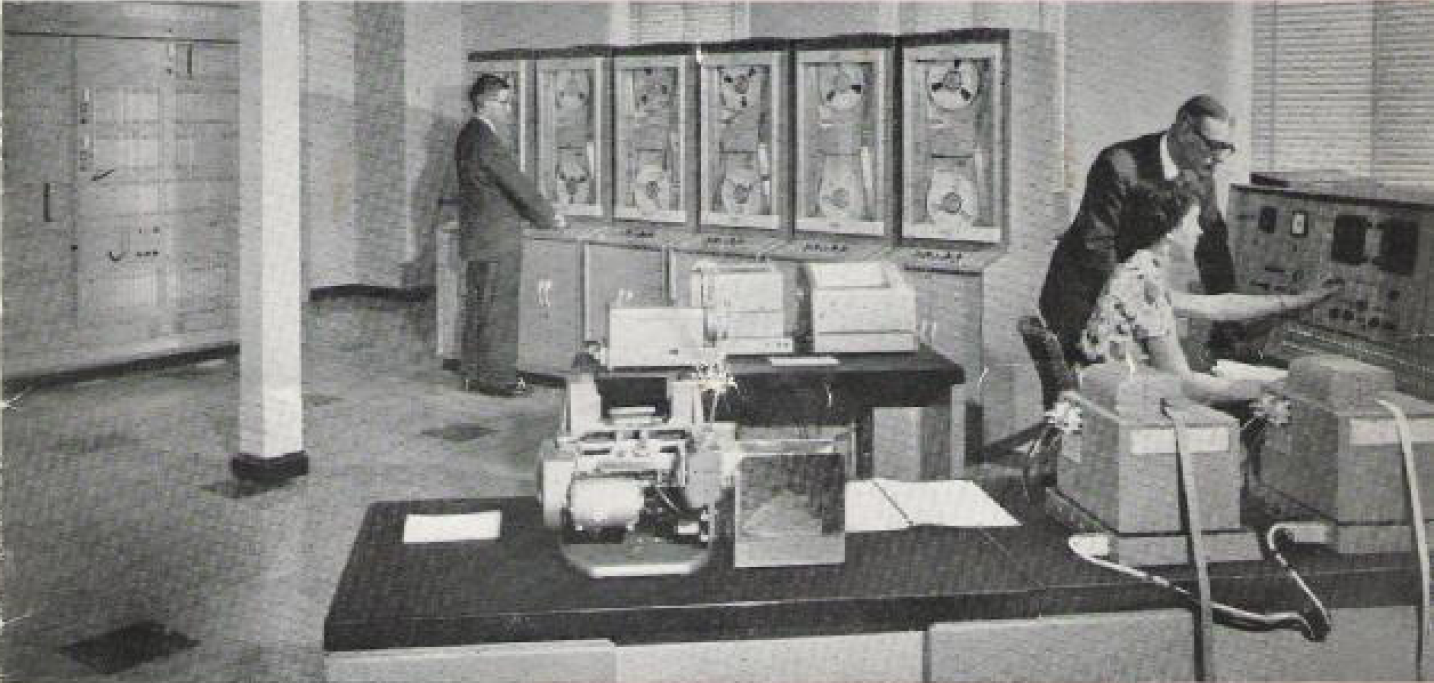
EMIDEC 1100 in Boots, Nottingham, UK, 1960

The EMIDEC 1100 computer (became the ICT 1101 in 1962) was produced by the Computing Services Division of EMI Laboratories in the UK under the leadership of Godfrey Hounsfield in 1958, (first delivered in 1959) after one year's development. It used magnetic-core memory and transistor technologies and it is claimed to be the first large commercial transistorised machine in the UK.

Core memory was a matrix of laced ferrite cores. Because transistors were relatively slow at that time, Hounsfield also used magnetic logic units to speed up the operation of the machine to achieve a processing power comparable with a valve/tube computer. These logic units consisted of a single ferrite ring (toroid), with up to fifteen connections to it.

Main storage capacity was 1,024 36-bit words - just over 4k bytes. Secondary storage was provided by magnetic drums, each of 4,096 words - about 20k. Anything else was stored on 1-inch-wide (25 mm) magnetic tape mounted in the vertical drive, vacuum-sealed behind a glass door. Peripherals included punched tape readers, punched card readers, and line printers.

24 EMIDEC 1100 computers were sold to commercial customers including Domestic Electric Rentals, Boots, British Motor Corporation, Kodak, London Transport, Barclays Bank and the Admiralty. They were used for a range of commercial and industrial applications.

The EMIDEC 2400 was a larger machine based on the same internal logic. 2400's were normally supplied with 16 or 32 kW of memory, significantly more than the 1100. The 2400 was designed to a requirement for the soon-to-be-introduced State Graduated Pension Scheme, and supported by the National Research Development Corporation (NDRC). The first machine of an eventual four (or five) was delivered to the Ministry of Pensions and National Insurance in Longbenton and went live in July 1962, at a cost of £600,000. This was later replaced by an ICL 1904.

In July 1962 EMI Computing Services Division became part of International Computers and Tabulators (ICT) which merged with other UK computer companies in 1968 to become International Computers Limited (ICL).

== See also ==
- History of computing hardware
