= JewishGen =

International electronic resource for Jewish genealogy

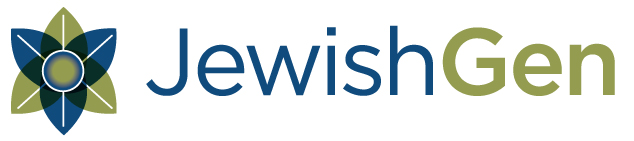
- Preserving Our History for Future Generations

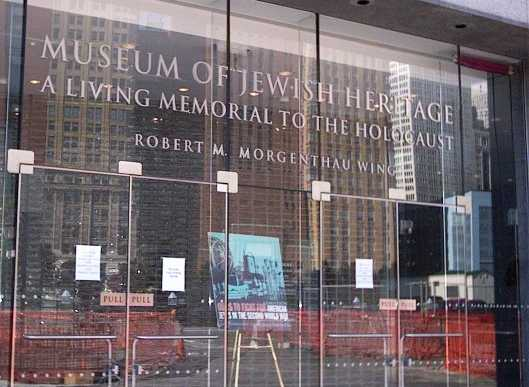
- Museum of Jewish Heritage – A Living Memorial to the Holocaust in New York City
- Formation: 1987; 39 years ago
- Founder: Susan E. King
- Type: Non-Profit
- Headquarters: New York City, New York
- Director of JewishGen: Paul Radensky
- Director of Outreach: Karen Franklin
- Chief Genealogist: Caitlin Hollander Waas
- Board of directors: Bruce Ratner (chairman) Peter Kalikow Jack Kliger E. Randol Schoenberg
- Parent organization: Museum of Jewish Heritage
- Volunteers: 1000+ (worldwide)
- Website: jewishgen.org

JewishGen is a non-profit organization founded in 1987 as an international electronic resource for Jewish genealogy. In 2003, JewishGen became an affiliate of the Museum of Jewish Heritage – A Living Memorial to the Holocaust in New York City, and is now a division of the Museum of Jewish Heritage. JewishGen provides a free, open-access platform for both amateur and professional genealogists to research Jewish family history and heritage.

== History ==
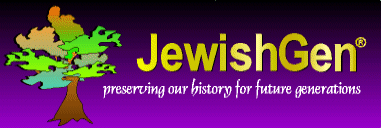
The old JewishGen logo

JewishGen was founded in 1987 by Susan E. King in Houston, Texas, as a Fidonet bulletin board with approximately 150 users interested in Jewish genealogy. To access the bulletin board, users dialed into the connection via telephones. Annual donations of $25 were requested to fund the service.

Around 1989 to 1990, JewishGen moved to the internet as a mailing list and online forum, and was called the Jewish Genealogy Conference. It was loosely managed by founding members and volunteers that included Warren Blatt, Susan E. King, Bernie Kouchel, Gary Mokotoff, Michael Tobias, and others active in the community. JewishGen had a website by 1995.

At the end of 2002, King announced that in 2003 JewishGen became an affiliate of the Museum of Jewish Heritage. In 2005, the International Association of Jewish Genealogical Societies (IAJGS) gave King an IAJGS Achievement Award for her work with JewishGen, citing the organization's worldwide impact. In March 2008, King retired, and JewishGen moved their administrative office to the museum's facilities.

In 2008, in a partnership with JewishGen, Ancestry.com took over the data center hosting of the JewishGen computerized assets. The agreement improved the JewishGen website's performance, which had been problematic, and created a licensing agreement with Ancestry.com for database access that created a revenue stream for JewishGen. The partnership increases Ancestry.com's access to and integration of Jewish genealogical resources from JewishGen.

In October 2022, JewishGen and the Museum of Jewish Heritage announced the establishment of the Peter and Mary Kalikow Jewish Genealogy Research Center. Located within the Museum, the Center functions as the physical home of JewishGen and is staffed on rotation by eight professional genealogists with diverse areas of expertise, as well as a full-time director

== Organization and Governance ==
JewishGen operates as the genealogical research division of the Museum of Jewish Heritage – A Living Memorial to the Holocaust in New York City. This structural integration allows JewishGen to function as an arm of the Museum, providing both digital and physical research infrastructure for global Jewish genealogy.

=== Professional Leadership ===
As of 2026, the professional staff of JewishGen include:

- Paul Radensky: Director of JewishGen and the Peter and Mary Kalikow Jewish Genealogy Research Center.
- Caitlin Hollander Waas: Chief Genealogist.
- Karen S. Franklin: Director of Outreach.

=== Volunteer Leadership ===
While the professional staff manages operations, JewishGen continues to rely on a global network of volunteer leadership for its specialized Research Divisions.

== Databases ==
- JewishGen Family Finder (JGFF): a compilation of surnames and towns currently being researched by over 100,000 Jewish genealogists worldwide. It contains over 500,000 entries, including 140,000 ancestral surnames and 18,000 town names, and is indexed and cross-referenced by both surname and town name. The Family Finder, like JewishGen's other databases, uses Daitch–Mokotoff Soundex, Beider-Morse Phonetic Matching and Damerau–Levenshtein distance fuzzy technology to yield results on all the different spellings of the name being searched. It connects users who are researching the same surnames and towns.
- Family Tree of the Jewish People (FTJP): a database of Jewish family trees. The central purpose of the FTJP is to enhance Jews' ability to connect and re-connect their families and to increase interest in Jewish genealogy.
- JewishGen Gazetteer: (formerly the "ShtetlSeeker") a database containing the names of all localities in 54 countries in Europe, North Africa, and the Middle East. The data is based on the U.S. Board on Geographic Names databases and contains more than 3 million names.
- JewishGen Communities Database: contains information on over 6,000 Jewish communities in Europe, North Africa and the Middle East, together with Jewish population figures, historical town names and jurisdictions, inset maps, and links to JewishGen resources.
- JewishGen Online Worldwide Burial Registry (JOWBR): a database of names and other identifying information from cemeteries and burial records worldwide. Contains more than three million burial records from 7,300 cemeteries in 128 countries, as of January 2018.
- JewishGen's Holocaust Database: a collection of databases containing information about Holocaust victims and survivors. It currently contains more than 2.75 million entries, including concentration-camp lists, transport lists, ghetto records, census lists, and ID cards.

=== All country databases ===
JewishGen's All Country Databases contain historical records, including birth, marriage and death records, census records, and military records with new data added regularly. Country databases currently exist for the following areas:

- JewishGen Austria-Czech Database
- JewishGen Belarus Database
- JewishGen Canada Database
- JewishGen France Database
- JewishGen Germany Database
- JewishGen Hungary Database
- JewishGen Latvia Database
- JewishGen Lithuania Database
- All Poland Database —in partnership with JRI-Poland
- JewishGen Romania Database —includes Romania and Moldova
- JewishGen Sephardic Database —including the Jeff Malka Sephardic Collection formerly hosted on SephardicGen
- JewishGen Scandinavia Database
- JewishGen Ukraine Database
- United Kingdom Database —in partnership with Jewish Genealogical Society of Great Britain (JGSGB)
- JewishGen USA Database

== Resources and research tools ==
- Yizkor Books: Translates Yizkor Books, predominantly written after the Holocaust, into English. There are currently hundreds of completed or partially completed translated books online.
- KehilaLinks: Creates "virtual" Yizkor Books online, by creating specific pages for towns and uploading information such as pictures, maps, personal recollections, and research data.
- Family Pages: Allows family researchers to create their own webpage for free in order to help connect with relatives and learn about their history.
- ViewMate: Allow users to post photographs and documents online, and request help in translating or identifying information.
- JewishGen Discussion Groups: Provide researchers with the opportunity to connect, ask questions, exchange information and learn from others. Discussion groups are categorized by general and specific areas/topics of interest.
- Special Interest Groups: Web pages and organized groups for Special Interest Group (SIGs) that focus on common geographic regions of origin or special topics.

== Education ==
- Beginner Pages: Web pages that explain the basics of Jewish genealogy and how to navigate JewishGen.
- JewishGen Education Center: Online interactive courses in Jewish genealogy to help researchers learn methodology, research techniques and organization of information for proper analysis.

== See also ==
- Avotaynu
- Dor Yeshorim - Committee for Prevention of Jewish Genetic Diseases
- Gesher Galicia
- IAJGS
- Where Once We Walked
