= Gary Mokotoff =

American author, lecturer and researcher

Personal life
- Born: Gary Mokotoff; April 26, 1937 New York City, New York US
- Died: August 31, 2025 (aged 88)
- Spouse: Ruth Mokotoff
- Children: 3
- Parent(s): Sylvia Mokotoff; Jack Mokotoff
- Occupation: Jewish Genealogist; Computer Scientist

Religious life
- Religion: Judaism
- Organisation: Avotaynu Inc

Gary Mokotoff (April 26, 1937 – August 31, 2025) was an author, lecturer, and Jewish genealogy researcher. Mokotoff was the publisher of AVOTAYNU, the International Review of Jewish Genealogy, and is the former president of the International Association of Jewish Genealogical Societies (IAJGS). He was the creator of the JewishGen's Jewish Genealogical Family Finder and the Jewish Genealogical People Finder. He co-authored the Daitch–Mokotoff Soundex system. Mokotoff is co-author of Where We Once Walked: A Guide to the Jewish Communities Destroyed in the Holocaust.

== Early life ==
Mokotoff was born in New York City to parents Sylvia Mokotoff (née Friedberg) and Jack Mokotoff. He grew up on the Lower East Side of Manhattan, spending his teenage years in Queens. His grandparents were Jewish immigrants from Russia-Poland.

== Career ==
=== Computer career ===
Mokotoff joined the IBM Applied Programming Department in 1959, working on developing systems software for the yet-to-be-announced IBM 1401. He is the author of SPS-1, SPS-2 IBM 1401 Symbolic Programming System, coauthor of 1401 Autocoder and participated in the 1401 Fortran II compiler project.

In 1965, Mokotoff was drafted into the U.S. Army and spent his entire two-year career in the data processing department at Fort Dix Army Air Base in Fort Dix, New Jersey. He led the team that installed the first computer at Fort Dix (an IBM 1401). For his efforts, he received a Certificate of Achievement from the Commanding General of the base. When he left the Army, he had achieved the rank of Specialist Fifth Class. In 1967, he returned to IBM.

In 1968, Mokotoff left IBM to form his own software company with partner Stanley F. Smillie. The company catered primarily to the retail industry. In the 1980s, the company, Data Universal Corp, developed a software system called Riva which it installed in early computer systems at such national retail chains as The Children's Place, Linens N Things and Bed, Bath & Beyond.

In 1985, he assisted the American Gathering of Jewish Holocaust Survivors and their Descendants to computerize the National Registry of Jewish Holocaust Survivors. This database is now located at the United States Holocaust Memorial Museum.

=== Genealogy career ===
The Forward calls Mokotoff an "all-around makher (Yiddish for mover and shaker) in the Jewish genealogical world." Mokotoff became involved in genealogy in 1979 to prove, successfully, that all persons named Mokotoff/Mokotov/Mokotow have a common ancestor. In 1980, he joined the Jewish Genealogical Society Inc. (New York) and the following year became a member of its board of directors. During his tenure on the board, he used his computer background to develop some of the earliest databases for Jewish genealogy including the Jewish Genealogical Family Finder (now called JewishGen Family Finder), a database used by more than 100,000 Jewish genealogists.

Recognizing that there were many spelling variants of Eastern European Jewish surnames, even though they sounded similar, Mokotoff collaborated with Randy Daitch to create the Daitch–Mokotoff Soundex, system which provides a phonetic alternative to searching databases of names.

In 1984, Mokotoff and Sallyann Amdur Sack formed a company, Avotaynu, Inc., which publishes Avotaynu Magazine. This journal has been published quarterly since 1985. In 1991, the company expanded its effort into book publishing with Where We Once Walked: A Guide to the Jewish Communities Destroyed in the Holocaust, a gazetteer which lists more than 23,000 towns in Central and Eastern Europe with large Jewish communities prior to the Holocaust. Originally published in 1991, with a revised edition in 2002, Judaica Librarianship calls Where Once We Walked, "the de facto print gazetteer of the shtetlekh of the Pale of Settlement." The book won the 1991 "Best Reference Book Award" of the Association of Jewish Libraries. Since then, Avotaynu has published more than seventy books, five of which have won awards. In 2003, the Association of Jewish Libraries gave Avotaynu Inc. its "Body of Work Award." This award has been given only five times in the past twenty years.

In 1987, at the request of Rabbi Malcolm H. Stern and Sallyann Amdur Sack, Mokotoff founded the International Association of Jewish Genealogical Societies, the international organization of Jewish genealogical societies all over the world.

In 1990, Mokotoff became a member of the board of directors of the Federation of Genealogical Societies (FGS). He served on the board, with some interruption, for fifteen years. In 2002, he served four years on the Board of the Association of Professional Genealogists.

In 2001, Mokotoff created the weekly e-zine of Jewish genealogy, called Nu? What’s New?

== Leadership ==
- 1981-1995: Board Member, Jewish Genealogical Society of New York. Also: Treasurer 1985-1989
- 1986-1989: Member, Advisory Committee, Douglas E. Goldman Genealogy Center, Beit Hatfutsot, Tel Aviv, Israel, where he assisted in promoting, worldwide, the family tree database of the Center
- 1989-1994: Member, Advisory Committee on Russian-American Genealogical Archival Service (RAGAS), which established the first exchange of genealogical data between the U.S. and Russia
- 1989-1995: Founding President, International Association of Jewish Genealogical Societies (IAJGS)
- 1991-2006: Board Member, Federation of Genealogical Societies (FGS). Also: Treasurer 1995–1998; Vice-President Development 1999–2000
- 1995-2001: Board Member, Jewish Book Council
- 1996-2001: Board Member, Association of Jewish Book Publishers
- 1996-2002: Board Member, JewishGen
- 2002-2005: Board Member, Association of Professional Genealogists. Also: Treasurer 2002-2005
- 2004–present: Founding Committee Member, International Institute of Jewish Genealogy, Jerusalem, Israel
- 2009–present: Member, Board of Governors, JewishGen. Also: Board Member 1996-2002; Co-Chair, Board of Governors 2009-2014

Additionally, Mokotoff has acted as a consultant for Ancestry.com in the area of Jewish genealogical resources and is the author of "Where Do I Begin" in the Jewish genealogy section of Ancestry.com.

== Honors ==
- 1985: Certified Systems Professional
- 1986: Certified Data Processor
- 1991: Reference Award from the Association of Jewish Libraries
- 1993: George E. Williams Award of the Federation of Genealogical Societies
- 1997: David S. Vogels, Jr. Award of the Federation of Genealogical Societies
- 1998: Lifetime Achievement Award of the International Association of Jewish Genealogical Societies (IAJGS) (first recipient)
- 2006: Grahame T. Smallwood Award of the Association of Professional Genealogists
- 2006: Rabbi Malcolm H. Stern Humanitarian Award of the Federation of Genealogical Societies
- 2008: Honorary Life Membership in the Association of Professional Genealogists

== Personal life ==
Mokotoff married Ruth Mokotoff (née Auerbach) in 1965. They have three children and eight grandchildren. He and his wife were members of Mensa International.

== Works and publications ==
- Mokotoff, Gary and Sallyann Amdur Sack, Where We Once Walked: A Guide to the Jewish Communities Destroyed in the Holocaust, Teaneck, N.J.: Avotaynu. 1991 (first edition). ISBN 978-0-962-63731-5 OCLC 23652677
- Mokotoff, Gary, How to Document Victims and Locate Survivors of the Holocaust. Teaneck, N.J.: Avotaynu. 1995. ISBN 978-0-962-63738-4 OCLC 32508662
- Mokotoff, Gary and Warren Blatt, Getting Started in Jewish Genealogy. Bergenfield, N.J..: Avotaynu. 1999. ISBN 978-1-886-22310-3 OCLC 42690064
- Mokotoff, Gary and Sallyann Amdur Sack with Alexander Sharon, Where Once We Walked: A Guide to the Jewish Communities Destroyed in the Holocaust. Bergenfield, N.J.: Avotaynu. 2002 (second, revised edition). ISBN 978-1-886-22315-8 OCLC 50768697
- Sack, Sallyann and Gary Mokotoff eds., Avotaynu Guide to Jewish Genealogy. Bergenfield, N.J.: Avotaynu. 2004. ISBN 978-1-886-22316-5 OCLC 53254059
- Mokotoff, Gary ed., Every Family has a Story: Tales from the Pages of Avotaynu. Bergenfield, N.J.: Avotaynu. 2008. ISBN 978-1-886-22336-3 (correct number on book) ISBN 978-1-886-22335-6 (LC number that is cataloged) OCLC 191865247
- Mokotoff, Gary, Getting Started in Jewish genealogy - 2012 Edition, Bergenfield, N.J..: Avotaynu. 2011. ISBN 978-0-983-69751-0 OCLC 762768716

== See also ==
- Jewish genealogy
- International Association of Jewish Genealogical Societies ("IAJGS")
- JewishGen
- Daitch–Mokotoff Soundex
- Avotaynu Magazine
- Sallyann Amdur Sack
- Where Once We Walked: A Guide to the Jewish Communities Destroyed in The Holocaust
- IBM 1401 Symbolic Programming System
