= Input/Output Control System =

Logical record API

Input/Output Control System (IOCS) is any of several packages on early IBM entry-level and mainframe computers that provided low level access to records on peripheral equipment. IOCS provides functionality similar to 1960s packages from other vendors, e.g., File Control Processor (FCP) in RCA 3301 Realcom Operating System, GEFRC in GECOS, and to the later Record Management Services (RMS) in DEC VAX/VMS (later OpenVMS.)

Computers in the 1950s and 1960s typically dealt with data that were organized into records either by the nature of the media, e.g., lines of print, or by application requirements. IOCS was intended to allow Assembler language programmers to read and write records without having to worry about the details of the various devices or the blocking of logical records into physical records. IOCS provided the run time I/O support for several compilers.

Computers of this era often did not have operating systems in the modern sense. Application programs called IOCS routines in a resident monitor, or included macro instructions that expanded to IOCS routines.

In some cases IOCS was designed to coexist with Simultaneous Peripheral Operations On-line (SPOOL) software.

The level of access is at a higher level than that provided by BIOS and BDOS in the PC world; in fact, IOCS has no support for character-oriented I/O, primarily because the systems for which it was designed didn't support it. Versions of IOCS existed for the IBM 705 III, 1401/1440/1460, 1410/7010, 7070/7072/7074, 7080 and 7040/7044/7090/7094. These systems heavily influenced the data management components of the operating systems for the System/360; the name IOCS was carried through in DOS/360 through z/VSE, with a distinction between Logical IOCS (LIOCS) and Physical IOCS (PIOCS).

Although some technical details and nomenclature are different among the various IOCS packages, the fundamental concepts are the same. For concreteness, the discussion and examples in this article will mostly be in terms of 7070 IOCS. Also, multiple continuation lines will be shown as ellipses (...) when they don't serve to illustrate the narrative.

== Structure ==
An IOCS program must do three things, each discussed in a subsection below.

- Identify required IOCS services
- Create control blocks for individual files
- Process files

For the 7070 these are done using 7070 Autocoder declarative statements and macro instructions.

=== Identify required IOCS services ===
IOCS supported several classes of I/O equipment

- Disk drives
- Tape drives
- Unit record equipment. The record length was dictated by the physical media, which were
  - Lines of print on paper
  - Punched 80-column (Note: IBM did not support the 90-column cards used by UNIVAC) cards

Some services offered by IOCS were not needed by all applications, e.g., checkpoints, label processing. An IOCS program must identify the particular devices types and services it uses. A 7070 IOCS program must specify one or more DIOCS statements: (Note: Note that operands in 7070 Autocoder always start in column 21.)

{{#parsoid

These declarative statements identify index registers reserved for the use of IOCS, indicate channels used, indicate whether the program is to coexist with SPOOL and provide processing options. The END DIOCS statement causes the assembly of IOCS unless a preassembled version is requested. The first (general) form is omitted when the D729 form is used.

In some other IOCS packages similar functions are provided by control cards.

=== Create control blocks for individual files ===
An IOCS program must create a control block for each file, specifying information unique to the file. For 7070 IOCS these are entries in the File Specification Table for tape files, each of which is generated by a DTF statement, or separate control blocks generated by DDF or DUF statements.

              11   22
     6        56   01
               DTF  OUT
     FCHANNEL       2
               ...  ...
     DAFILE    DDF
     IODEVICE       5
     DREFMODE       4
               ...  ... 
               DUF  CONSFILE,1,4,CARDRDW,CARDIX,CONSEOF,CONSERR

In some other IOCS packages similar functions are provided by control cards.

=== Process files ===
The above code defines a tape file on channel 1 called OUT, a sequential 1301/1302 disk file called DAFILE and a card file called CONSFILE.

Any IOCS program must specify the actions that it wishes to perform. In 7070 IOCS this is done with processing macros.

              11   22
     6        56   01
               OPEN CONSFILE,OUT
     LOOP      GET  CONSFILE
               PUT  OUT
               B    LOOP
     CONSEOF   CLOSECONSFILE,OUT

In some other IOCS packages similar functions are provided by explicit subroutine calls.

== See also ==
- BIOS
- Sharp IOCS, a similarly named system on 8-bit pocket computers by Sharp
