= Where Once We Walked =

Gazetteer of town names in Central and Eastern Europe

- First edition
- Author: Gary Mokotoff, Sallyann Amdur Sack
- Language: English
- Genre: genealogy
- Publisher: Avotaynu Inc.
- Publication date: 1991
- Publication place: United States
- Media type: Print (hardcover)
- Pages: 514
- ISBN: 1-886223-15-7
- OCLC: 50768697
- Dewey Decimal: 940/.04924/00254 21
- LC Class: DS135.E83 M65 2002

Where Once We Walked (full title: Where Once We Walked: A Guide to the Jewish Communities Destroyed in The Holocaust), compiled by noted genealogist Gary Mokotoff and Sallyann Amdur Sack with Alexander Sharon, is a gazetteer of 37,000 town names in Central and Eastern Europe focusing on those with Jewish populations in the 19th and first half of the 20th centuries and most of whose Jewish communities were almost or completely destroyed during The Holocaust.

== Overview ==
The book includes a cross-referenced listing of some 23,000 towns (plus alternate names), with the contemporary spelling being primary, associated country (according to contemporary borders), orientation and distance in kilometers from the country's capital city, and map coordinates. The main list is followed by an additional listing organized according to a phonetic index based on the Daitch–Mokotoff Soundex system.

== Revised edition ==
A second, revised edition (2002), expanded with additional entries and alternate names, provides updated spellings reflecting current geopolitical naming conventions. Judaica Librarianship called Where Once We Walked, "the de facto print gazetteer of the shtetlekh of the Pale of Settlement."

== See also ==
- JewishGen
- List of villages and towns depopulated of Jews during the Holocaust
- List of shtetls
