= Warren Blatt =

American genealogist and computer engineer

Warren Blatt (born 1962) is an American genealogist and computer engineer who is the Managing Director of JewishGen, an online source for researching Jewish roots. He is the author/coauthor of a number of books including Getting Started in Jewish Genealogy (with Gary Mokotoff).

Blatt received the Lifetime Achievement Award of the International Association of Jewish Genealogical Societies in 2004.

== Works and publications ==
- Blatt, Warren (1996). Resources for Jewish Genealogy in the Boston Area. Boston, MA: Jewish Genealogical Society of Greater Boston. ISBN 978-0-9652151-0-7. OCLC 34929772.
- Blatt, Warren (1996). FAQ: Frequently Asked Questions About Jewish Genealogy. Teaneck, NJ: Avotaynu. ISBN 978-1-886223-04-2. OCLC 36001080.
- Mokotoff, Gary; Blatt, Warren (1999). Getting Started in Jewish Genealogy. Bergenfield, New Jersey: Avotaynu. ISBN 978-1-886223-10-3. OCLC 42690064.
- Blatt, Warren (2003). Polish-Jewish Genealogical Research. Hobart, Indiana: Repeat Performance. OCLC 64391396.
- Blatt, Warren; Tobias, Michael (2003). Introduction to JewishGen Databases. Hobart, Indiana: Repeat Performance. OCLC 64391426.
