= Stephen P. Morse =

American electrical engineer

Stephen Paul Morse (born May 1940) is an American electrical engineer. He is the architect of the Intel 8086 chip and is the originator of the "One Step" search page tools used by genealogists.

== Early life ==
Morse was born in Brooklyn, New York. He has degrees in electrical engineering from the City College of New York, the Polytechnic Institute of Brooklyn and New York University.

== Career ==
=== Intel 8086 ===
Morse worked for Bell Laboratories, IBM's Watson Research Center, Intel, and General Electric Corporate Research and Development. He was a principal architect of Intel 8086 microprocessor chip, designed by Intel between early 1976 and June 8, 1978.

He is quoted as saying:

"While I'd like to think that the PC wouldn't exist today if I hadn't designed the 8086, the reality is that it would be based on some other processor family. The instruction set would be radically different, but there would still be a PC. I was just fortunate enough to be at the right place at the right time."

=== Genealogy ===
In the early 2000s, he has applied his technology expertise to web-based genealogy search tools. His "One Step" search pages are widely used by genealogists all over the world. He is also a co-author, with linguist Alexander Beider, of the Beider–Morse phonetic name matching algorithm.
