= Sallyann Sack-Pikus =

American genealogist and psychologist

- Born: Sallyann Amdur; March 13, 1936; Cleveland, Ohio
- Education: PhD
- Alma mater: Harvard University, George Washington University
- Occupations: Genealogist, Psychologist
- Spouse(s): Lawrence Sack (m. 1956-2003; his death); Irwin Pikus (m. 2008)
- Children: 3
- Writing career
- Subjects: Jewish history, Jewish genealogy
- Notable works: Where Once We Walked, Avotaynu Magazine

Sallyann Sack-Pikus (née Amdur; born March 13, 1936) is an American genealogist and psychologist, and editor of Avotaynu Magazine, a journal of Jewish genealogy and scholarship. Sack is the only genealogist listed in Jewish Women in America.

Born on March 13, 1936, in Cleveland, Ohio, the elder daughter of Max and Frances (Steinsnider) Amdur, Sallyann Amdur was instrumental in founding the International Institute for Jewish Genealogy (currently chairperson of the board), Jewish Genealogy Society of Greater Washington (founding president), International Association of Jewish Genealogical Societies, and Avotaynu.

Sack has chaired or co-chaired seven of the annual conferences on Jewish genealogy, authored seven books of use to genealogists and has consulted on numerous projects. A recipient of IAJGS Lifetime Achievement Award, she resides in Bethesda, Maryland, where she is a clinical psychologist in private practice, having received her degrees from Harvard University and George Washington University.

== Published works ==
- Avotaynu Guide to Jewish Genealogy
- Where Once We Walked, a Guide to Jewish Communities Destroyed in the Holocaust. Winner of Best Reference Book of the Year of the Association of Jewish Libraries.
- Jewish Genealogical Research in Israel
- Russian Consular Records Index and Catalog
- Jewish Vital Records, Revision Lists and Other Jewish Holdings in the Lithuanian Archives
- Some Archival Sources for Ukrainian Jewish Genealogy
- Search for the Family
