= Alexander Beider =

Russian linguist (born 1963)

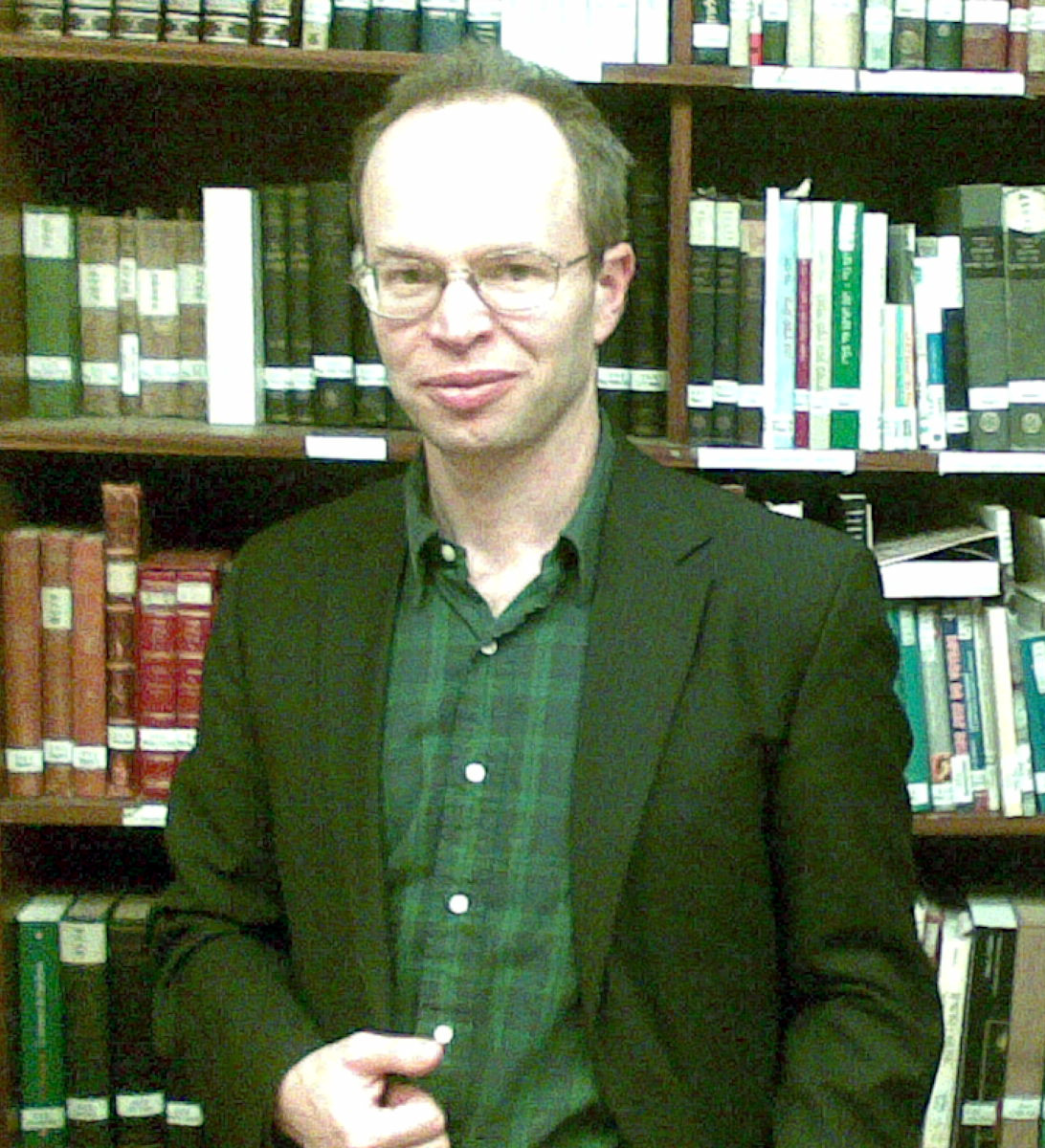

Alexander Borisovich Beider (Russian: Александр Борисович Бейдер, IPA: [ɐlʲɪkˈsandr bɐˈrʲisəvʲɪdʑ ˈbʲejdʲɪr]; Yiddish: אַלכּסנדר בײדער, IPA: [alɛkˈsandər ˈbɛɪdər]; born 1963) is the author of reference books in the field of Jewish onomastics and the linguistic history of Yiddish.

== Biography ==
Alexander Beider was born in Moscow in 1963. In 1986 he graduated from the Moscow Institute of Physics and Technology and in 1989 he received a PhD in applied mathematics from the same institution. Since 1990, he lives with his family in Paris, France.

His works deal with etymology and geographic distribution of Jewish surnames, traditional Yiddish given names, methodological principles of studying names, and the history of Yiddish. His papers have been published by scholarly journals in US, France, Israel, Poland, and Russia. In 1999, he received his PhD in Jewish studies, from the Sorbonne, with thesis about Ashkenazic Jewry names. He is also the co-author with Stephen P. Morse of the Beider–Morse Phonetic Name Matching Algorithm.

Beider "provided historical context on Jewish origins" to a team of genetic researchers studying Jews from 14th-century Erfurt, Germany and became listed as a co-author of their final paper.

== Bibliography ==
- Beider, A. 2019. A Dictionary of Jewish Surnames from Italy, France and "Portuguese" Communities. New Haven, CT: Avotaynu.
- Beider, A. 2017. A Dictionary of Jewish Surnames from Maghreb, Gibraltar, and Malta. New Haven, CT: Avotaynu.
- Beider, A. 2015. Origins of Yiddish Dialects. Oxford: Oxford University Press.
- Beider, A. 2009. Handbook of Ashkenazic Given Names and Their Variants. Bergenfield, NJ: Avotaynu Inc..
- Beider, A. & Morse, S. P. 2008. Beider–Morse Phonetic Matching: An Alternative to Soundex with Fewer False Hits. Avotaynu: The International Review of Jewish Genealogy 24/2: 12–18.
- Beider, A. 2005. Scientific Approach to Etymology of Surnames. Names: A Journal of Onomastics 53: 79–126.
- Beider, A. 2004. A Dictionary of Jewish Surnames from Galicia. Bergenfield, NJ: Avotaynu.
- Beider, A. 2001. A Dictionary of Ashkenazic Given Names: Their Origins, Structure, Pronunciation, and Migration s. Bergenfield, NJ: Avotaynu.
- Beider, A. 1996. A Dictionary of Jewish Surnames from the Kingdom of Poland. Teaneck, NJ: Avotaynu.["Best Judaica Reference Book" award for 1996]
- Beider, A. 1995. Jewish Surnames from Prague (15th-18th centuries). Teaneck, NJ: Avotaynu.
- Beider, A. 1993, 2008. A Dictionary of Jewish Surnames from the Russian Empire. Teaneck, NJ: Avotaynu.
