= Jewish Genealogical Society of Great Britain =

- Abbreviation: JGSGB
- Formation: March 1992
- Type: British Jews genealogy
- Headquarters: United Kingdom
- Website: www.jgsgb.org.uk

The Jewish Genealogical Society of Great Britain (JGSGB) is a society for the study and encouragement of Jewish genealogy in Great Britain. The society is a member society of the International Association of Jewish Genealogical Societies.

== Purpose ==
The society's mission is to promote and encourage the study of Jewish genealogy, and assist all those tracing the family history of their Jewish ancestors. It encourages Jewish genealogical education and research and promotes the indexing, transcription and preservation of old records. It encourages research and promotes the preservation of Jewish records and resources, sharing information amongst its members.

== Services ==
The society offers Family History workshops, training courses in genealogy, a library and computers for genealogical research, an online discussion group, and in-person support provided by mentors and a genealogical Enquiries Officer.

The society also hosts meetings for Anglo-Jewish, Sephardi and Dutch, German, and Eastern European Jewish special interest groups. Regional groups meet regarding the Jewish communities of South East London, South West London, East of London and Essex, Leeds and Manchester.

== Library ==
The society's Genealogical Resource Library contains information and resources including more than a thousand books relating to genealogy, computers and a selection of genealogical CD-ROMs and other genealogical databases. It also has a large collection of maps, leaflets, microfiches and microfilms, including copies of many of the major Anglo-Jewish genealogy collections. The library also holds the largest collection of Yizkor (memorial) books in the United Kingdom.

There is a collection of genealogical magazines from societies all over the world, including Avotaynu, the world's largest circulation magazine devoted to Jewish genealogy.

== Publication ==
The society publishes the journal Shemot (Names) quarterly. The journal contains a variety of articles of interest to genealogists, book reviews, abstracts of overseas genealogical articles and practical research tips information.

== See also ==
- British Jews
- History of the Jews in the United Kingdom
