= Gesher Galicia =

Jewish genealogical nonprofit organization

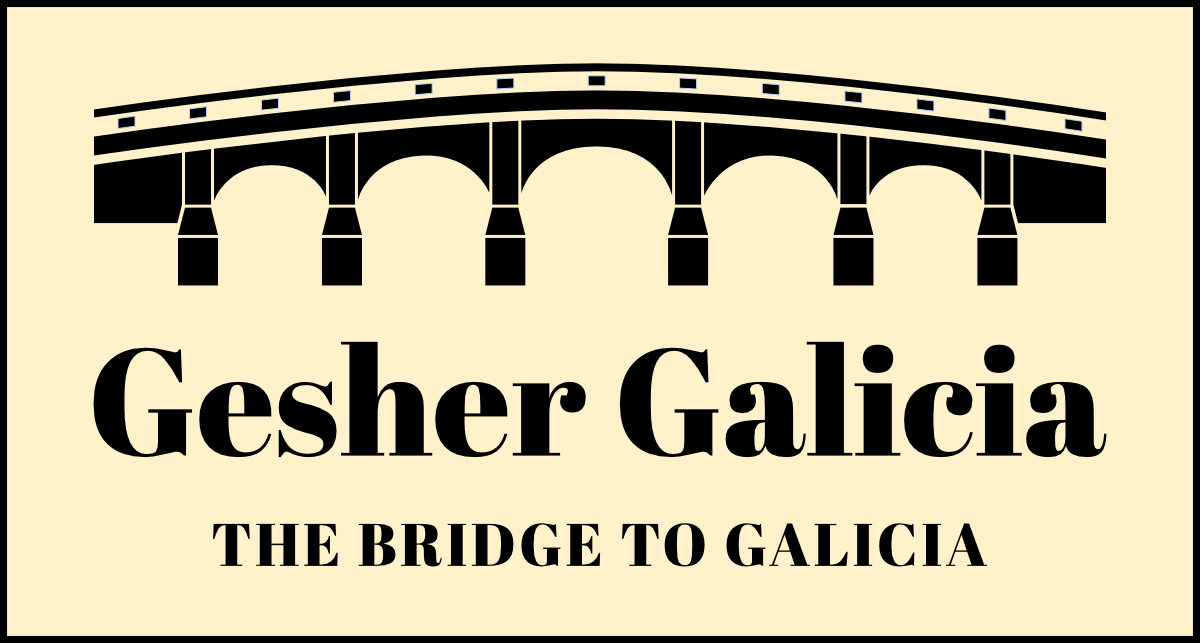
- Formation: 1993
- Founder: Suzan Wynne
- Type: Nonprofit
- Services: Genealogical research; Education; Cultural preservation
- Fields: Jewish genealogy
- President: Steven S. Turner
- Website: geshergalicia.org

Gesher Galicia is a Jewish genealogical nonprofit organization, operating as a special interest group for those with Jewish roots from the former Austrian-ruled province of Galicia, part of modern-day western Ukraine and southeastern Poland.

The organization's specific purposes are to conduct research, education, publish the Gesher Galicia Family Finder, reproduce regional and cadastral maps, maintain networking and online discussion groups, and to promote and support Jewish heritage and preservation work in the areas of the former Galicia. Its research includes the indexing of archival vital records, Holocaust records, surveys, and census books.

Gesher Galicia is a registered 501(c)(3) non-profit organization. It is an associate member of the International Association of Jewish Genealogical Societies.

== History ==
Gesher Galicia was founded as a special interest group in the summer of 1993 by Suzan Wynne, a teacher, lecturer, author, and founding member of the Jewish Genealogy Society of Greater Washington.

The organization has collaborated with several national archives, among them, the Central Archives of Historical Records (AGAD), one of Poland's four national archives, with whom they covered topics such as the AGAD's records, Jewish-Galician records in other Polish and Ukrainian archives, Holocaust records, maps and cadastral surveys, and non traditional record sources at a symposium held in Warsaw in 2018.

== Research ==
The core mission of Gesher Galicia is to generate genealogical data, with a focus on the Jewish population that once lived in the former province of Galicia. The organization also contributes sources that are useful for historical and cultural research of the area. Research is conducted in the archives in Poland and Ukraine, and is complemented by archival collections in Austria, the Czech Republic, Hungary, Israel, and elsewhere pertaining to Galician Jews. Gesher Galicia’s researchers extract key data, namely from vital records (birth, marriage, and death records), as well as from other sources of interest, such as census, property, school, voter, and tax records. Special projects include the Holocaust, Taxpayer, Jewish Medical Students, Jewish students from Galicia in Vienna and Josephine and Franciscan cadastral surveys. Gesher Galicia provides an open access to two search engines. The Record Inventories is a web-based tool for identifying archival sources for Jewish records from Galicia across a range of archives and from different countries, as collected by several organizations. The All Galicia Database, on the other hand, allows researchers to search for individuals based on the records indexed by Gesher Galicia, from the period 1786 to 1945.

=== The Galitzianer ===
The Galitzianer is a quarterly journal provided to the members of Gesher Galicia. The journal features material broadly linked to Jewish life in Austrian Galicia (1772-1918) and during other periods, including the Holocaust.The Galitizianer features updates on archival records and genealogical research, as well as a range of family stories and articles on the history of Galicia. Its contributors include genealogists and authors from cultural and academic institutions. Periodically, the journal publishes a special series of articles, such as genealogy lessons or articles on Galician Jewish contributions to politics or the arts.

== Structure ==
=== Leadership ===
- Suzan Wynne (1993-1997)
- Shelley Pollero (1998-2005)
- Pamela Weisberger (2006-2015)
- Tony Kahane (2015-2019)
- Steven S. Turner (2019–present)
