= International Association of Jewish Genealogical Societies =

International Association of Jewish Genealogical Societies (IAJGS)
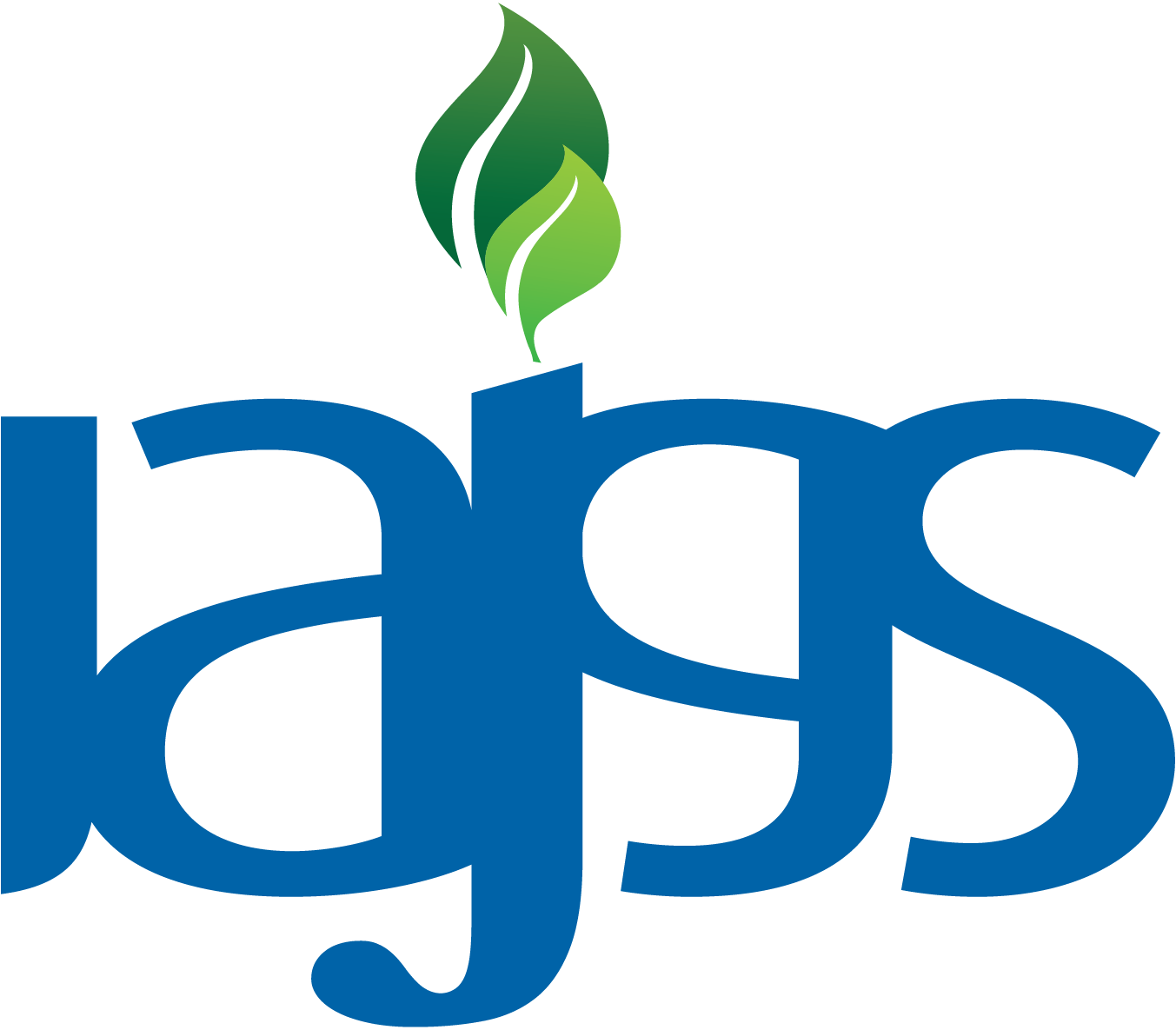
- Founded: late-1980s
- Purpose: Genealogy, education
- Region served: 14 countries
- Website: www.iajgs.org

The International Association of Jewish Genealogical Societies, Inc. (IAJGS) is an independent non-profit umbrella organization coordinating the activities and annual conference of 84 Jewish genealogical societies worldwide.

== History ==
The IAJGS was formed in the late-1980s. Rabbi Malcolm H. Stern and Sallyann Amdur Sack were instrumental in creating the initial concept, and assisted various member organizations with their formation.

== Annual conferences ==
The IAJGS coordinates an annual conference on Jewish genealogy, which takes place in a different city each year. The conferences have an educational track and include opportunities for networking and meetings with SIGs and BOF groups. Topics like DNA testing are typically covered. In recent years, attendees have described success stories after hitting research roadblocks.

=== Past conferences ===
- 1981: New York City, Summer Seminar on Jewish Genealogy
- 1982: Washington DC, Summer Seminar on Jewish Genealogy II
- 1983: Los Angeles, 3rd National Summer Seminar on Jewish Genealogy
- 1984: Chicago, 4th National Summer Seminar on Jewish Genealogy
- 1984: Jerusalem, International Seminar on Jewish Genealogy
- 1985: New York City, 5th National Summer Seminar on Jewish Genealogy
- 1986: Salt Lake City, 6th National Summer Seminar on Jewish Genealogy
- 1987: London, 2nd International Jewish Genealogy Conference
- 1988: Washington DC, 7th Summer Seminar on Jewish Genealogy
- 1989: Philadelphia, 8th National Seminar on Jewish Genealogy
- 1990: Los Angeles, 9th Annual Seminar on Jewish Genealogy
- 1991: Salt Lake City, 3rd International Seminar on Jewish Genealogy
- 1992: New York City, 11th Annual Seminar on Jewish Genealogy
- 1993: Toronto, 12th Annual International Summer Seminar on Jewish Genealogy
- 1994: Jerusalem, 4th International Seminar on Jewish Genealogy
- 1995: Washington DC, 14th Summer Seminar on Jewish Genealogy. June 25–29, 1995
- 1996: Boston, 15th Summer Seminar on Jewish Genealogy – hosted by the JGS of Greater Boston. July 14–19, 1996, at the Boston Park Plaza
- 1997: Paris, 5th International Seminar on Jewish Genealogy / 5e Congrès International de Généalogie Juive
- 1998: Los Angeles, 18th Annual Seminar on Jewish Genealogy. July 12–17, 1998
- 1999: New York City, 19th Annual Conference on Jewish Genealogy – hosted by the Jewish Genealogical Society New York (JGSNY). August 8–13, 1999, at the New York Marriott
- 2000: Salt Lake City, 20th Annual Conference on Jewish Genealogy. July 9–14, 2000, at DoubleTree Suites by Hilton Hotel Salt Lake City
- 2001: London, 21st International Conference on Jewish Genealogy – hosted by the JGS of Great Britain. July 8–13, 2001 at the Hotel Inter-Continental London
- 2002: Toronto, 22nd IAJGS International Conference on Jewish Genealogy – hosted by the Jewish Genealogical Society of Canada (Toronto). August 4–9, 2002, at Sheraton Centre Toronto Hotel
- 2003: Washington DC, 23rd IAJGS International Conference on Jewish Genealogy – hosted by Jewish Genealogy Society of Greater Washington. July 20–25, 2003, at the JW Marriott Hotel
- 2004: Jerusalem, 24th IAJGS International Conference on Jewish Genealogy – hosted by the Israel Genealogical Society. July 4–9, 2004, at the Renaissance Jerusalem Hotel
- 2005: Las Vegas, 25th IAJGS International Conference on Jewish Genealogy – hosted by Jewish Genealogy Society of Southern Nevada. July 10–15, 2005, at the Flamingo Las Vegas
- 2006: New York City, 26th IAJGS International Conference on Jewish Genealogy – hosted by Jewish Genealogical Society (NY). August 13–18, 2006, at New York Marriott Marquis Hotel
- 2007: Salt Lake City, 27th IAJGS International Conference on Jewish Genealogy – hosted by IAJGS. July 15–20, 2007, at Hilton City Center
- 2008: Chicago, 28th IAJGS International Conference on Jewish Genealogy – co-hosted by IAJGS, Jewish Genealogical Society of Illinois and Illiana Jewish Genealogical Society. August 17–22, 2008, at Chicago Marriott Downtown Magnificent Mile
- 2009: Philadelphia, 29th IAJGS International Conference on Jewish Genealogy – co-hosted by IAJGS and Jewish Genealogical Society of Greater Philadelphia. August 2–7, 2009, at Sheraton Philadelphia City
- 2010: Los Angeles, 30th IAJGS International Conference on Jewish Genealogy – hosted by Jewish Genealogical Society of Los Angeles. July 11–16, 2010, at JW Marriott Los Angeles LA LIVE
- 2011: Washington DC, 31st IAJGS International Conference on Jewish Genealogy – hosted by Jewish Genealogy Society of Greater Washington DC. August 14–19, 2011, at Grand Hyatt Washington Center Hotel
- 2012: Paris, 32nd IAJGS International Conference on Jewish Genealogy – hosted by Cercle de Généalogie Juive in partnership with Jewish Genealogical Societies of Switzerland, Belgium and Luxembourg. July 15–18, 2012, at Paris Marriott Rive Gauche Hotel & Conference Center
- 2013: Boston, 33rd IAJGS International Conference on Jewish Genealogy – co-hosted by IAJGS and Jewish Genealogical Society of Greater Boston. August 4–9, 2013, at Boston Park Plaza
- 2014: Salt Lake City, 34th IAJGS International Conference on Jewish Genealogy – co-hosted by IAJGS and Utah Jewish Genealogical Society. July 27–August 1, 2014, at Hilton City Center
- 2015: Jerusalem, 35th IAJGS International Conference on Jewish Genealogy – co-hosted by IAJGS and Israel Genealogy Research Association and IGS. July 6–10, 2015, at the Ramada Hotel Jerusalem
- 2016: Seattle, 36th IAJGS International Conference on Jewish Genealogy – co-hosted by IAJGS and Jewish Genealogical Society of Washington State and local host Jewish Genealogical Society of Oregon. August 7–12, 2016, at the Sheraton Seattle
- 2017: Orlando, 37th Annual IAJGS International Conference on Jewish Genealogy – co-hosted by IAJGS and the International Association of Jewish Genealogical Societies and the Jewish Genealogical Society of Greater Orlando. July 23-28, 2017, at Walt Disney World Swan Resort Orlando
- 2018: Warsaw, 38th IAJGS International Conference on Jewish Genealogy co-hosted by POLIN Museum of the History of Polish Jews, Emanuel Ringelblum Jewish Historical Institute of Warsaw in cooperation with The Polish State Archives. August 5–10, 2018, at Hilton Warsaw Hotel and Convention Centre
- 2019: Cleveland, 39th IAJGS International Conference on Jewish Genealogy – 39th IAJGS International Conference on Jewish Genealogy with local host The Jewish Genealogy Society of Cleveland. July 28–August 2, 2019, at the Hilton Cleveland Downtown Hotel
- 2020: San Diego, CA, 40th IAJGS International Conference on Jewish Genealogy. August 9–14, 2020 at the Sheraton San Diego Hotel & Marina [Cancelled, hosted virtually due to Coronavirus 2019 pandemic]
- 2021: Philadelphia, PA 41st IAJGS International Conference on Jewish Genealogy [Cancelled, hosted virtually due to Coronavirus 2019 pandemic]
- 2022: Hosted virtually
- 2023: London, England
- 2024: Philadelphia, PA hosted at the Center City Philadelphia Sheraton in August 2024
- 2025: Fort Wayne, IN hosted at the Grand Wayne Convention Center
- 2026: Initially scheduled virtually; postponed to a virtual event in April 2027.

== International Jewish Genealogy Month ==
International Jewish Genealogy Month honors Jewish ancestors through the pursuit of Jewish family history research. IAJGS sponsors and supports International Jewish Genealogy Month by holding an annual poster contest. The goal of International Jewish Genealogy Month is to encourage Jewish genealogy and publicize JGS organizations and activities all over the world. It is celebrated annually on the Hebrew month of Cheshvan. From 1999 through 2006, Avotaynu, Inc. promoted Jewish Genealogy Month until 2007 when IAJGS began sponsoring the event.

== Member organizations ==
IAJGS supported member organizations offer regular meetings and educational events, often centered around genealogical subjects like DNA genealogy and other specialized research.

=== Jewish Genealogical Societies ===
==== Non-USA members ====
- Argentina
  - Asociación de Genealogía Judía de Argentina
- Australia
  - Australian Jewish Genealogical Society, Inc.
  - Australian Jewish Genealogical Society (Victoria), Inc.
  - Jewish Genealogy & History Society of South Australia
- Belgium
  - Cercle de Généalogie Juive de Belgique aka Kring voor Joodse Genealogie in Belgie
- Brazil
  - Sociedade de Genealogia Judaica do Rio de Janeiro (SGJRJ)
  - Sociedade Genealógica Judaica São Paulo
- Canada
  - Genealogical Institute of the Jewish Heritage Centre of Western Canada, Inc.
  - Jewish Genealogical Society of British Columbia
  - Jewish Genealogical Society of Hamilton & Area
  - Jewish Genealogical Society of Montreal
  - Jewish Genealogical Society of Ottawa
  - Jewish Genealogical Society of Toronto
- Denmark
  - Jewish Genealogical Society of Denmark
- France
  - Cercle de Généalogie Juive
- Germany
  - Hamburger Gesellschaft für Jüdische Genealogie e.v.
- Great Britain
  - Jewish Genealogical Society of Great Britain
- Israel
  - Amoetat Akevoth (Dutch Jewish Genealogical Data Base)
  - Israel Genealogy Research Association (IGRA)
  - Israel Genealogical Society
  - Israeli “Family Roots” Forum (Hebrew)
- Jamaica
  - Jamaica Jewish Genealogical Society
- South Africa
  - Jewish Genealogical Society of South Africa
- Sweden
  - Judiska Släktforskningsföreningen i Sverige
- Switzerland
  - Schweizerische Vereinigung für Jüdische Genealogie
- Venezuela
  - Asociación de Genealogía Judía de Venezuela

==== USA members ====
- Arizona
  - Phoenix Jewish Genealogy Society
- California
  - Jewish Genealogical Society of the Conejo Valley and Ventura County
  - Jewish Genealogical Society of Los Angeles
  - Orange County Jewish Genealogy Society
  - Jewish Genealogical Society of Sacramento
  - San Diego Jewish Genealogical Society
  - San Francisco Bay Area Jewish Genealogical Society
- Colorado
  - Jewish Genealogical Society of Colorado
- Connecticut
  - Jewish Genealogical Society of Connecticut
- District of Columbia
  - Jewish Genealogy Society of Greater Washington – includes Maryland and Virginia
- Florida
  - Jewish Genealogical Society of Broward County, Inc.
  - Jewish Genealogical Society of Greater Miami, Inc.
  - Jewish Genealogy Society of Northeast Florida
  - Jewish Genealogical Society of Greater Orlando
  - Jewish Genealogical Society of Palm Beach County, Inc.
  - Jewish Genealogical Society of Southwest Florida
  - Jewish Genealogical Society of Tallahassee
  - Jewish Genealogical Society of Tampa Bay
  - Jewish Genealogy SIG of The Villages Genealogical Society
- Georgia
  - Jewish Genealogical Society of Georgia
- Illinois
  - Jewish Genealogical Society of Illinois
- Indiana
  - Northeast Indiana Jewish Genealogy Society
  - Michiana Jewish Historical Society (Indiana)
- Maine
  - Documenting Maine Jewry
- Maryland
  - Jewish Genealogy Society of Central Maryland
  - Jewish Genealogy Society of Maryland
- Massachusetts
  - Jewish Genealogical Society of Greater Boston, Inc.
  - Western Massachusetts Jewish Genealogical Society
- Michigan
  - Jewish Genealogical Society of Michigan
- Minnesota
  - Minnesota Jewish Genealogical Society
- Missouri:
  - Jewish Genealogical Society of Greater Kansas City
  - Jewish SIG of the St. Louis Genealogical Society
- Nevada
  - Jewish Genealogy Society Southern Nevada, Inc.
- New Jersey
  - Jewish Historical Society of Central Jersey
  - Jewish Genealogical Society of North Jersey
  - Mercer County Jewish Genealogy Society at Beth El Synagogue
- New Mexico
  - Jewish Genealogical Society of New Mexico
- New York
  - Capital Region Jewish Genealogical Society (Albany Area)
  - Jewish Genealogical Society of Brooklyn
  - Jewish Genealogical Society of Buffalo
  - Jewish Genealogical Society, Inc.
  - Jewish Genealogy Society of Long Island
- North Carolina
  - Triangle Jewish Genealogical Society
  - Western North Carolina Jewish Genealogical Society
- Ohio
  - Jewish Genealogy Society of Cleveland
  - Jewish Genealogical Group, Columbus Jewish Historical Society
  - Miami Valley Jewish Genealogical and Historical Society
- Oklahoma
  - Jewish Genealogical Society of Tulsa
- Oregon
  - Jewish Genealogical Society of Oregon
  - Jewish Genealogical Society of Willamette Valley Oregon
- Pennsylvania
  - Jewish Genealogical Society of Greater Philadelphia
  - Jewish Genealogy Society of Pittsburgh
- Tennessee
  - Jewish Genealogical Society of Nashville
- Texas
  - Dallas Jewish Historical Society, Jewish Genealogy Interest Group
  - Greater Houston Jewish Genealogical Society
  - Jewish Genealogical Society of San Antonio
- Utah:
  - Utah Jewish Genealogical Society
- Washington
  - Jewish Genealogical Society of Washington State

=== Topical members ===
- Kremenets District Research Group
- Sephardic Heritage Project

=== Associate members ===
- Anyksciai Cousins‘ Club – Worldwide
- Bene Israel Heritage Museum & Genealogical Research Centre – Mumbai, India
- The Jewish Genealogy Group of the Tiszafüredi Menóra Nyílt Alapítvány – Tiszafüred, Hungary
- JewishGen
- MyHeritage
- Gesher Galicia

== See also ==
- Jewish genealogy
- JewishGen
- Australian Jewish Historical Society
- Jewish Genealogical Society of Great Britain
