= Jewish genealogy =

Study of Jewish families

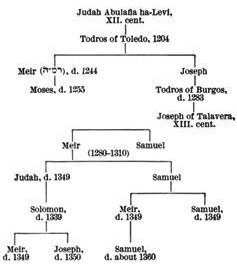
Partial family tree of the Abulafia family of Spain

Jewish genealogy is the study of Jewish families and the tracing of their lineages and history. The Pentateuchal equivalent for "genealogies" is "toledot" (generations). In later Hebrew, as in Aramaic, the term and its derivatives "yiḥus" and "yuḥasin" recur with the implication of legitimacy or nobility of birth. In Modern Hebrew, genealogy is generally referred to as "שורשים"/"shorashim", the Hebrew word for roots, or borrowing from the English, "גנאלוגי"/"genealogi".

Since Judaism is not only a religious community but an ethnic group that claims descent from common ancestry, there has been significant interest in tracing Jewish descent. To this day there are Jews who trace their descent from the ancient tribe of priests (kohanim) and levites (leviim) of the Jewish Bible and who still receive special recognition in areas such as the Jewish synagogue service.

Due to the importance of Torah learning in the Jewish tradition, genealogical records of rabbis and Hasidic rebbes are carefully recorded and readily available.

The Holocaust was a significant factor in stimulating the research of Jewish genealogy. Many Jews were tormented by questions of what and who had been lost. In response, a number of genealogical agencies were created, including the International Tracing Service (ITS) in Arolsen, the Search Bureau for Missing Relatives in Jerusalem, and museum and resource Yad Vashem. CRARG (Czestochowa-Radomsko Area Research Group)(www.crarg.org) finds and translates Holocaust survivor lists and death lists from around Poland. Its database is one of the largest on the web, with over 300,000 records so far, covering hundreds of towns and consisting of more than 160 separate projects.

The 1976 TV miniseries of Alex Hailey’s book, Roots: The Saga of an American Family, is generally credited with popularizing genealogy. Finding Our Fathers: A Guidebook to Jewish Genealogy, by Dan Rottenberg, published in 1977, was the first modern guide to tracing Jewish ancestors. From Generation to Generation: How to Trace Your Jewish Genealogy and Family History by Arthur Kurzweil, published in 1980, was a significant text in the evolution of Jewish genealogy. Avotaynu magazine was launched in 1985. JewishGen, an electronic resource for Jewish genealogy, was established in 1987. Following the formation of a number of Jewish genealogical societies, the International Association of Jewish Genealogical Societies (IAJGS) was set up in 1988. Their activities include hosting annual conferences, normally in the United States.

Sephardic critics of the leading institutions in Jewish genealogy argue they are Ashkenazi-centric and that they platform claims about Sephardic genealogy that are not compliant with genealogical standards. These include the identitarian claims of the crypto-Judaism movement and claims of Sephardic populations in eastern Europe. The SephardicGen website was established in 2007 by Jeff Malka, with a name apparently intended to differentiate from JewishGen. The Sephardic Diaspora group was set up on Facebook in 2014 following the removal of a Sephardic academic from the then largest Jewish genealogy group, Tracing the Tribe. The Sephardic Genealogical Society was established in 2020.

Since 2021, records from SephardicGen are also present and searchable on JewishGen. At the time the collection debuted in July 2021, it included 146,000 records pertaining to Jews from such countries as Algeria, Austria, Bulgaria, Balkan nations, Croatia, Egypt, France, Greece, Italy, Libya, Morocco, Spain, and Tunisia, indexed by Mathilde Tagger. Records from the component databases comprising the Jeff Malka Sephardic Collection are also discoverable through searching the entirety of JewishGen. The original SephardicGen website still exists and continues to provide resources to researchers.

== Family pedigrees ==
Some Jewish families have preserved traditions relating to their tribal affiliation, based on partial genealogical records passed down generation after generation. In Yemen, for example, some Jews trace their lineage to Judah, others to Benjamin, while yet others to Levi and Reuben. Some Ashkenazi Jews have "Levi" and/or "Cohen" as surnames, probably because their ancestors were levites/cohanim. Of particular interest is one distinguished Jewish family of Yemen who traced their lineage to Bonai, one of the sons of Peretz, the son of Judah.

Rabbinic families also kept records called Yichus which detailed family lineages. When rabbis published any religious text or commentary, their family lineage would be included to show authority. Neil Rosenstein traced major Ashkenazi Rabbinic dynasties in his book The Unbroken Chain.

== See also ==
- Genealogies in the Bible
- Kings of Israel and Judah

=== Portals, Databases, Archives ===
- List of genealogy portals
- List of general genealogy databases
- List of national archives

=== Genetics ===
- Genetic studies on Jews
- Y-chromosomal Aaron
- Genetic genealogy
- Genealogical DNA test
