= IBM 1410 =

Variable wordlength decimal computer announced by IBM in 1960

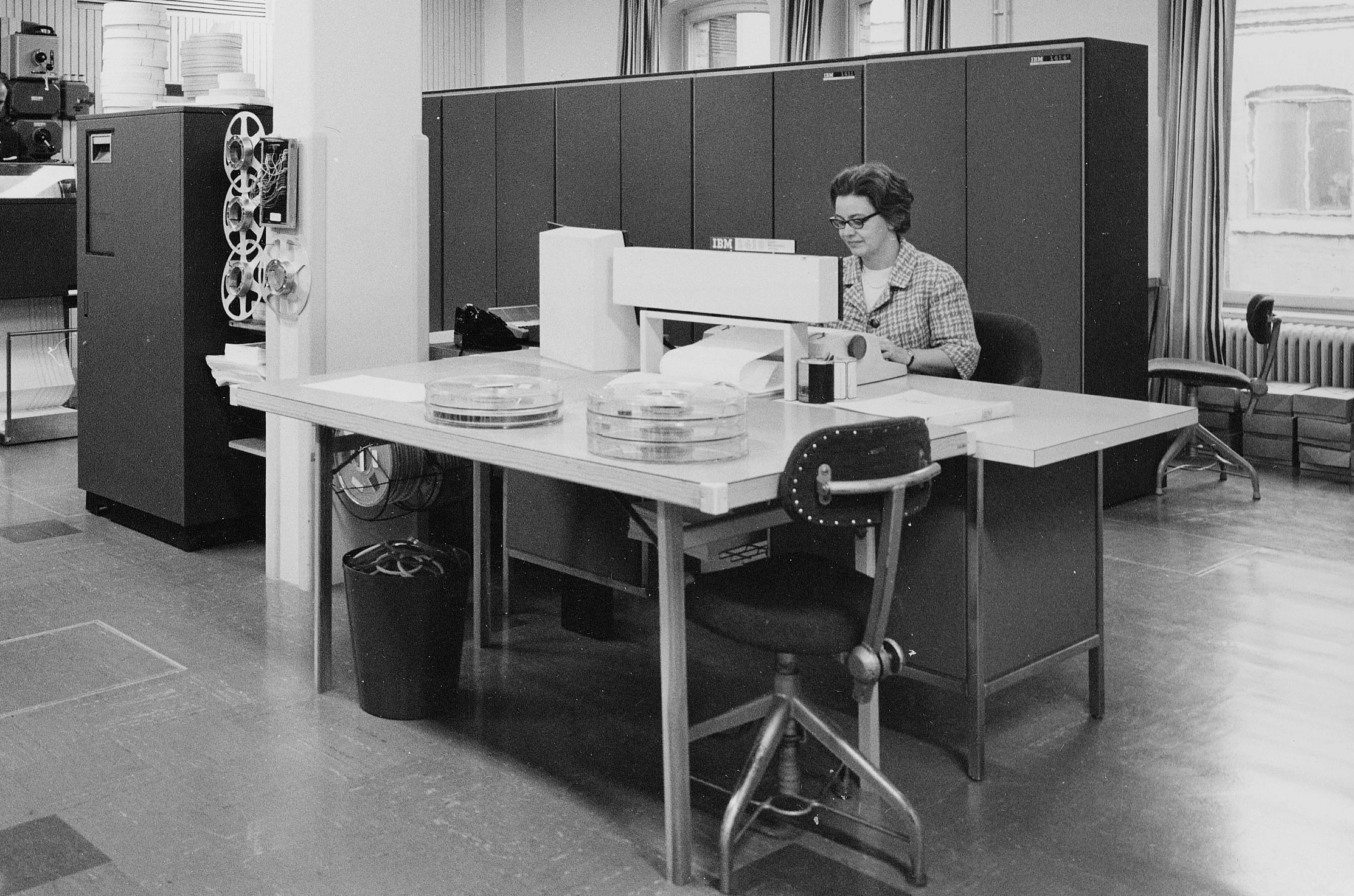
IBM 1410 Data Processing System: IBM 1415 Console (on front) IBM 1414 Input/Output Synchronizer and IBM 1411 CPU (on background) IBM 1011 and IBM 1403 printer also visible.

The IBM 1410, a member of the IBM 1400 series, was a decimal computer with a variable word length that was announced by IBM on September 12, 1960 and marketed as a midrange business computer. It was withdrawn on March 30, 1970.

== Overview ==
The 1410 was similar in design to the very popular IBM 1401, but it had one major difference. Addresses were five characters long and allowed a maximum memory of 80,000 characters, much larger than the 16,000 characters permitted by the 1401's three-character addresses. However, the 1410 could also be run in what was termed "1401 compatibility mode". This was accomplished in hardware - the machine literally turned into a 1401 with the flip of a switch. In addition, with care, it was possible to write source code in the Autocoder assembler language that could be used on either system, as nearly all 1401 instructions had exact 1410 equivalents, and had the same mnemonics.

The later IBM 7010 used the same architecture as the 1410, but was implemented with 7000 series technology (see IBM 700/7000 series), and supported up to 100,000 characters of storage.
