= IBM 1401 =

1960s decimal computer

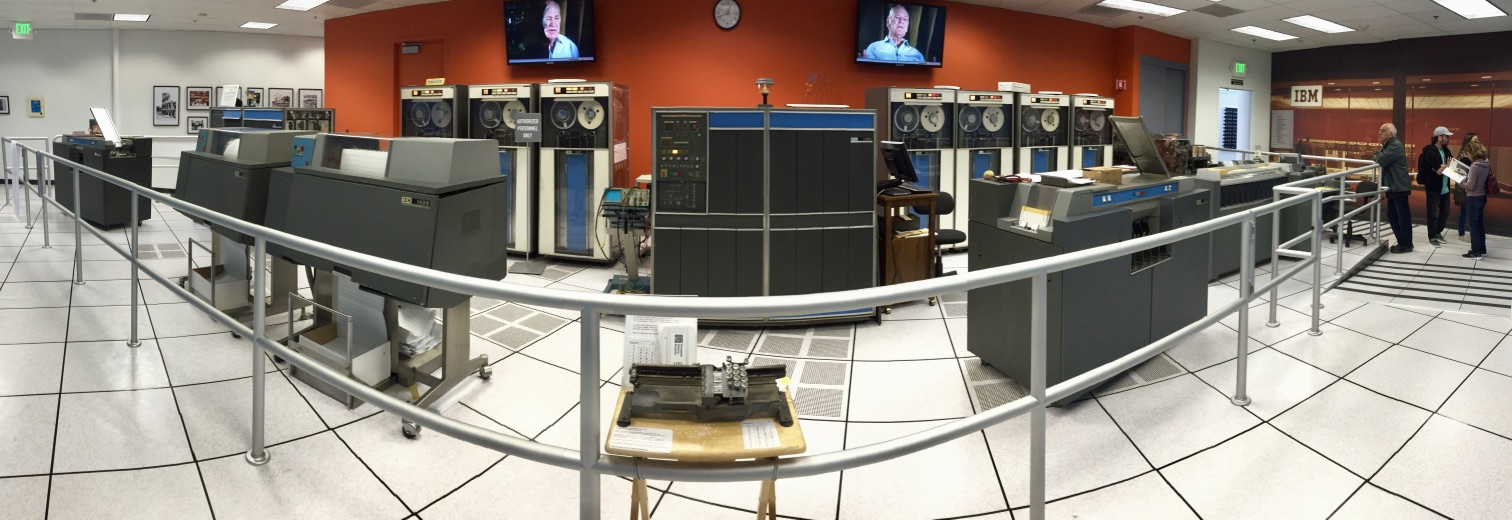
- IBM 1401 at Computer History Museum
- Designer: IBM
- Bits: 6-bits plus word mark and parity
- Introduced: 1959
- Design: CISC
- Type: Memory-Memory
- Encoding: Variable
- Branching: Branch instruction with modifier character
- Endianness: Big-endian

Registers
- 3: Instruction Address Register (IAR), Instruction Register (IR), B Register

The IBM 1401 is a variable-wordlength decimal computer that was announced by IBM on October 5, 1959. The first member of the highly successful IBM 1400 series, it was aimed at replacing unit record equipment for processing data stored on punched cards and at providing peripheral services for larger computers. The 1401 is considered by IBM to be the Ford Model-T of the computer industry due to its mass appeal. Over 12,000 units were produced and many were leased or resold after they were replaced with newer technology. The 1401 was withdrawn on February 8, 1971.

== History ==
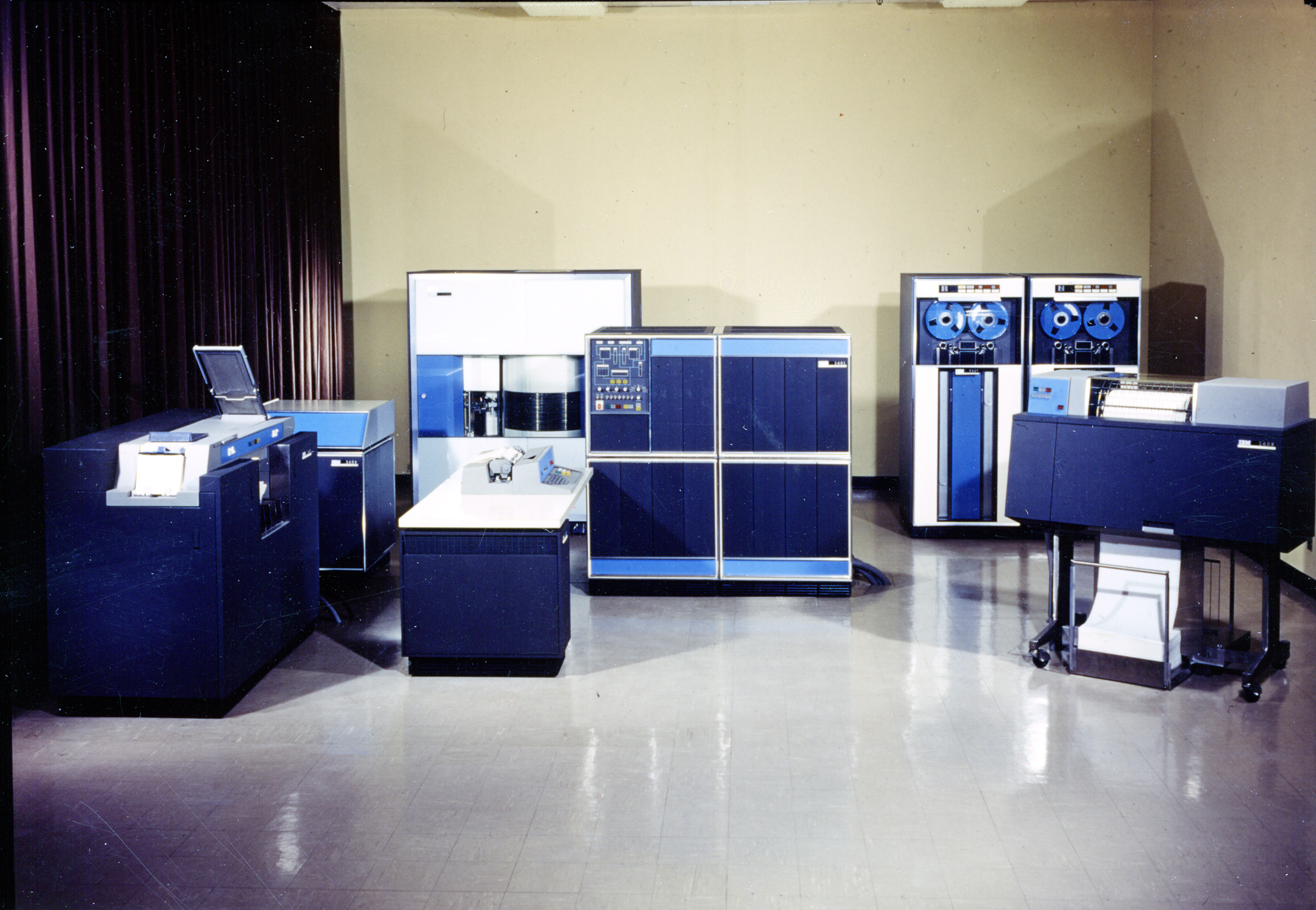
IBM 1401 Data Processing System. From the left: 1402 Card Read-Punch, 1406 Storage Unit, 1405 RAMAC Disk Unit, 1407 Console Inquiry Station, 1401 Processing Unit, two 729 Magnetic Tape Units, 1403 Printer. (courtesy of IBM Archives)

The 1401 project evolved from an IBM project named "World Wide Accounting Machine" (WWAM), which in turn was a reaction to the success of the Bull Gamma 3.

The 1401 was used as an independent system in conjunction with IBM punched card equipment. It was also operated as auxiliary equipment to IBM 700 or 7000 series systems.

Monthly rental for 1401 configurations started at US$2,500 (worth about $27,600 today). Demand exceeded expectations.

"IBM was pleasantly surprised (perhaps shocked) to receive 5,200 orders in just the first five weeks – more than predicted for the entire life of the machine!" By late 1961, the 2000 units installed in the US were about one quarter of all electronic stored-program computers by all manufacturers. The number of installed 1401s peaked above 10,000 in the mid-1960s. "In all, by the mid-1960s nearly half of all computer systems in the world were 1401-type systems." The system was marketed until February 1971.

Commonly used by small businesses as their primary data processing machines, the 1401 was also frequently used as an off-line peripheral controller for mainframe computers. In such installations, with an IBM 7090 for example, the mainframe computers used only magnetic tape for input-output. It was the 1401 that transferred input data from slow peripherals (such as the IBM 1402 Card Read-Punch) to tape, and transferred output data from tape to the card punch, the IBM 1403 Printer, or other peripherals. This allowed the mainframe's throughput to not be limited by the speed of a card reader or printer. (For more information, see spooling.) Some later installations (e.g., at NASA) included the 1401 as a front-end peripherals controller to an IBM 7094 in a Direct Coupled System (DCS).

Elements within IBM, notably John Haanstra, an executive in charge of 1401 deployment, supported its continuation in larger models for evolving needs (e.g., the IBM 1410) but the 1964 decision at the top to focus resources on the System/360 ended these efforts rather suddenly.

IBM was facing a competitive threat from the Honeywell 200 and the 360's incompatibility with the 1401 design. IBM pioneered the use of microcode emulation, in the form of ROM, so that some System/360 models could run 1401 programs.

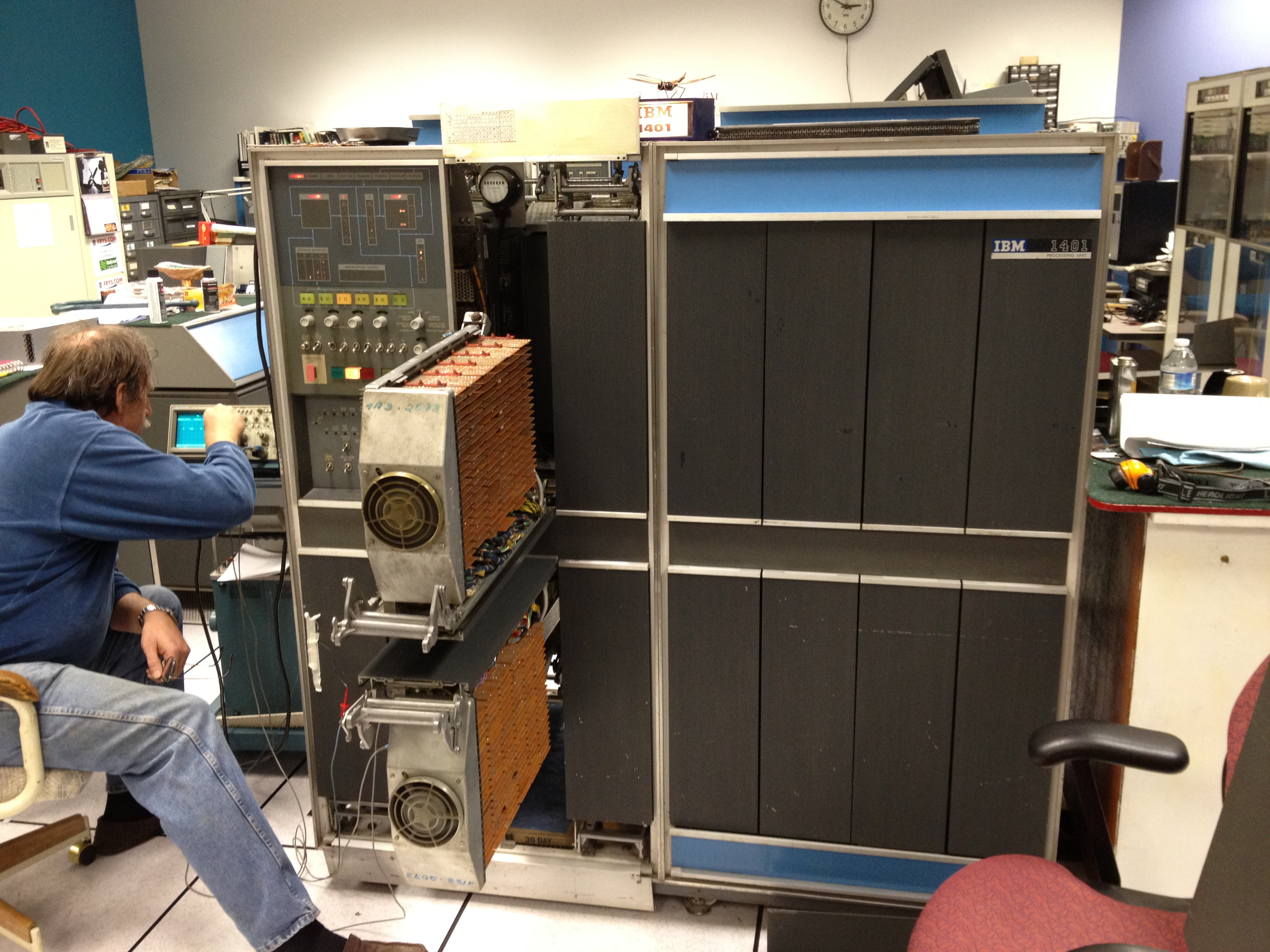
A volunteer repairing a 1401 at the Computer History Museum

Due to its popularity and mass-production, the IBM 1401 was often considered to be the first electronic mainframe computer to be introduced in various countries, such as Singapore (1963; for the Central Provident Fund Board) and South Korea (1967; for the Economic Planning Board). During the 1970s, IBM installed many 1401s in India and Pakistan where they were in use well into the 1980s.

Two 1401 systems have been restored to operating order at the Computer History Museum in Mountain View, California.

== Architecture ==
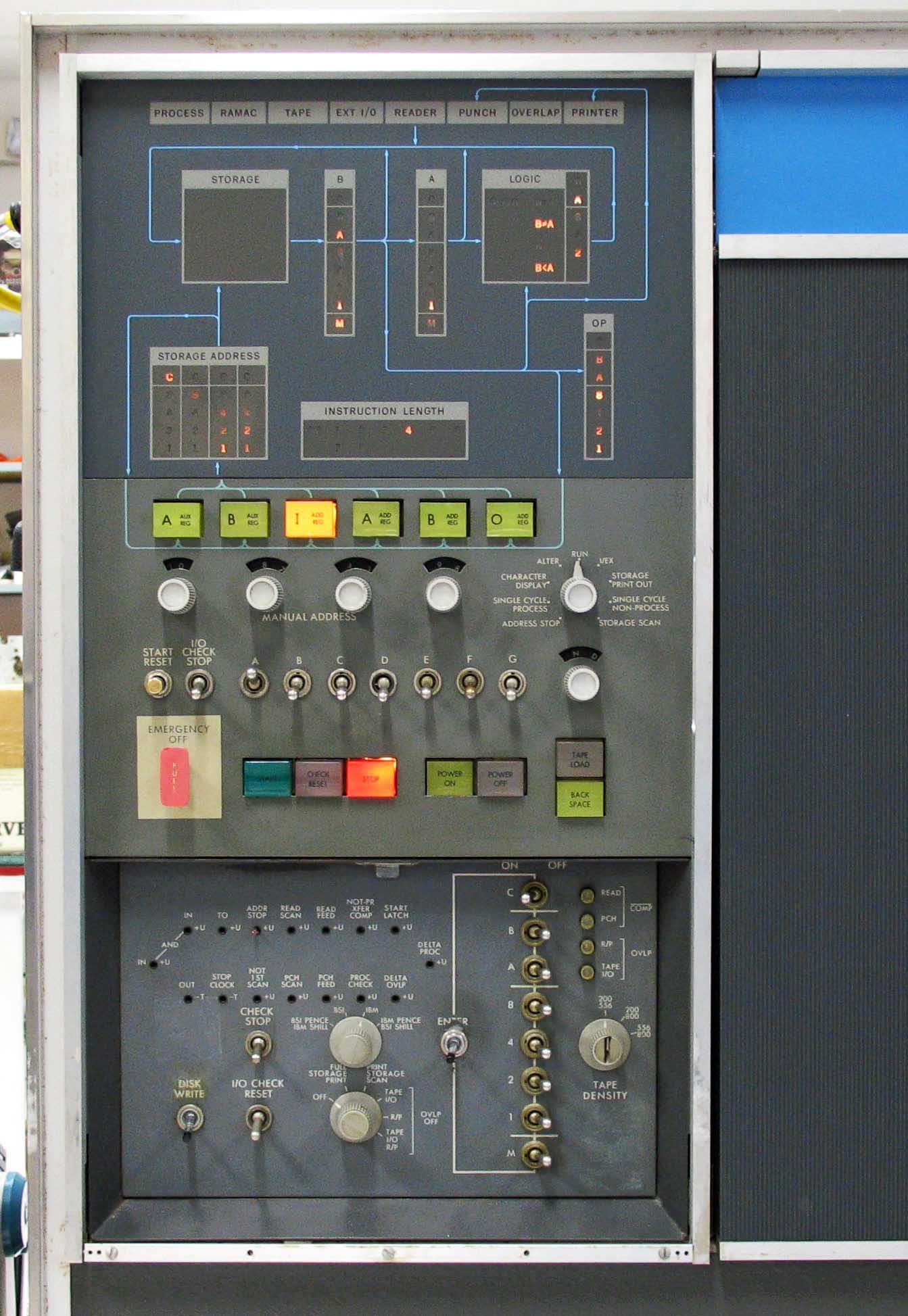
1401 Console and, below, the Auxiliary Console.

Each alphanumeric character in the 1401 is encoded by six bits, called B,A,8,4,2,1. The B,A bits are called zone bits and the 8,4,2,1 bits are called numeric bits, terms taken from the IBM 80 column punched card.

- For digits 1 through 9, the bits B,A are zero, the digit BCD encoded in bits 8,4,2,1. Digit 0 is encoded 8,2.
- For alphabetic characters the setting of bits is derived from the zone and digit punches of the IBM 80 column punched card character code: B,A from 12, B from 11, and A from 0; the setting of bits 8,4,2,1 from BCD encoding of the 1 through 9 punches. Thus the letter A, 12,1 in the punched card character code, is encoded B,A,1.
- Encodings of punched card characters with two or more digit punches can be found in the character and op codes table.

IBM called the 1401's character code BCD ("binary-coded decimal"), even though that term describes only the decimal digit encoding. The 1401's alphanumeric collating sequence is compatible with the punched card collating sequence.

Associated with each memory location are two other bits, called C for odd parity check and M for word mark. M is present in memory but not on punched cards, and has to be set using special machine instructions; when printing memory it is typically displayed by underlining the character. C is calculated automatically and is also not present on punched cards.

Each memory location then, has the following bits:

C B A 8 4 2 1 M

The 1401 was available in six memory configurations: 1,400, 2,000, 4,000, 8,000, 12,000, or 16,000 characters. (Note: The 1401 is a decimal computer, so e.g. "8000" characters is not 8,192 characters.) Each character is addressable, addresses ranging from 0 through 15999. A very small number of 1401s were expanded to 32,000 characters by special request.

Some operations use specific memory locations (those locations are not reserved and can be used for other purposes). Read a card stores the 80 columns of data from a card into memory locations 001–080. Index registers 1, 2 and 3 are in memory locations 087–089, 092-094 and 097-099 respectively. Punch a card punches the contents of memory locations 101-180 into a card. Write a line prints the contents of memory locations 201–332.

The 1401's instruction format is

  Opcode
   with   [A-or-I-or-unit-address [B-address]] [modifier]
 word mark

Opcodes are one character. Memory addresses ("I" a branch target, "A" and "B" data) and unit address are three characters. The opcode modifier is one character. Instruction length is then 1, 2, 4, 5, 7, or 8 characters. Most instructions have to be followed by a word mark (a requirement commonly met by the word mark with the opcode of the next instruction).

See Character and op codes for a list of operations.

A three-character memory address in an instruction is an encoding of a five-digit memory address. The three low-order digits of the five-digit address, 000 to 999, are specified by the numeric bits of the three characters. The zone bits of the high-order character specify an increment as follows: A 1000, B 2000, B and A together 3000, giving an addressability of 4,000 memory locations. The zone bits of the low-order character specify increments of 4000, 8000, or 12000, to address 16,000 memory locations (with an IBM 1406 Storage Unit). (Note: More simply stated: the four zone bits encoded the decimal values 0 to 15 as the binary numbers 0000 to 1111. The encoded value is used as the thousands part of a 1401 address. Thus making the 1401 a curious machine with memory addresses stored as a combination of 3 decimal digits and 4 binary digits. IBM did not use the word "binary" in describing the 1401's addressing (see the 1401 Reference Manual).) For example, the three-character address "I99" is a reference to memory location 3000 + 999, or 3999.

The zone bits of the middle character of a three-character memory address can specify one of three index registers, one of many optional features.

Operands referenced by the A-address and B-address can be: a single memory location, a variable-length field, or a variable-length record. Variable-length fields are addressed at their low-order (highest-addressed) position, their length defined by a word mark set at their high-order (lowest-addressed) position. When an operation such as addition is performed, the processor begins at the low-order position of the two fields and works its way to the high-order, just as a person would when adding with pencil and paper.

The only limit on the length of such fields is the available memory. Instructions applicable to variable-length fields include: Add, Subtract, Multiply, Divide, Compare, Move Characters to A or B Word Mark, Move Characters and Edit. One or more adjacent variable-length fields can make up a variable-length record. A variable-length record is addressed at its high-order position, its length defined by a group-mark character with a word mark or a record-mark character in its low-order position. The instruction Move Characters Record or Group Mark can be used to assemble a block of records. A variable-length record, or block of records, to be written to magnetic tape is addressed at its high-order position, its length defined by a group-mark character with a word mark immediately following its low-order position.

A sequence of operations on adjacent fields can be "chained", using the addresses left in the address registers by the previous operation. For example, addition of adjacent data fields might be coded as A 700,850, A 695,845, A 690,840. With chaining, this can be coded as A 700,850, A, A - omitting data address from the second and third instructions.

=== IBM 1401G ===
The IBM 1401G was sold in six models: (G1 and G11: 1,400 storage positions; G2 and G12 for 2,000; G3 and G13 for 4,000). One difference between the 1401 and 1401G is how the reader-punch is controlled.

== Booting and sample program ==
When the LOAD button on the 1402 Card Read-Punch is pressed, a card is read into memory locations 001–080, a word mark is set in location 001 to indicate that it is an executable instruction, the word marks in locations 002-080 (if any) are cleared, and execution starts with the instruction at location 001. That is always the dyadic Set Word Mark, to set word marks on the two following words (instructions). A single Set Word Mark instruction can set two word marks but requires one word mark to have been on itself, so a sequence of these instructions are needed, which incrementally set word marks in the program's code or data, and set word marks for subsequent Set Word Mark instructions. Execution of instructions in the card continues, setting word marks, loading the program into memory, and then branching to the program's start address. To read subsequent cards, an explicit Read command (opcode 1) must be executed as the last instruction on every card to get the new card's contents into locations 001–080. Note that the word marks are not erased when the Read command is executed, but are kept as-is for the next card read in. This is convenient, because much of what the first few cards do is set word marks in the proper locations; having the first half dozen or so word marks set means the programmer does not need to set those word marks again.

One-card programs can be written for various tasks. Commonly available were a one-card program to print the deck of cards following it, and another to duplicate a deck to the card punch. See Tom Van Vleck's web site. Here is a one-card program which will print "HELLO, WORLD!". Pressing LOAD (above) reads one card, and begins execution at 001 (the first ,). The program will automatically set its own wordmarks, assuming that the first , has a wordmark already.

,036008,040015,044022,051029,052053/299/332L0652132.HELLO, WORLD!

Following conventional IBM notation, the underscores show where word marks are set in memory once the program has run; on punched cards they would not be indicated visually or present in the punched data.

The program is:

- Set Word Mark (opcode , operands 036 008). This must always be the first instruction, and one of its operands must always be 008 or else the next instruction would not have a word mark to indicate that it is an executable instruction.
- Additional Set Word Marks. The underscores show where the word marks are after completing all , opcodes. Only word marks from 036 and further are needed for the "guts" of the program; word marks up through 029 are only needed for Set Word Mark instructions. Since the core of the program needs six word marks, five Set Word Mark instructions are needed in total. The reason one fewer is needed is because the final Set Word Mark does not need to waste an operand on other Set Word Marks
- Clear Storage - the rest of the print area 299-200 (opcode / operand 299)
- Clear Storage - part of the print area 332-300 (opcode / operand 332)
- Move HELLO, WORLD! to the print area (opcode L, operands 065 and 213. Move stops due to the word mark in location 052 (which, doing double-duty, also defines the end of the Halt and branch instruction))
- Write a Line on the printer (opcode 2; "HELLO, WORLD!" will be printed in the 13 leftmost printer positions)
- Halt (opcode .)

== Hardware implementation ==
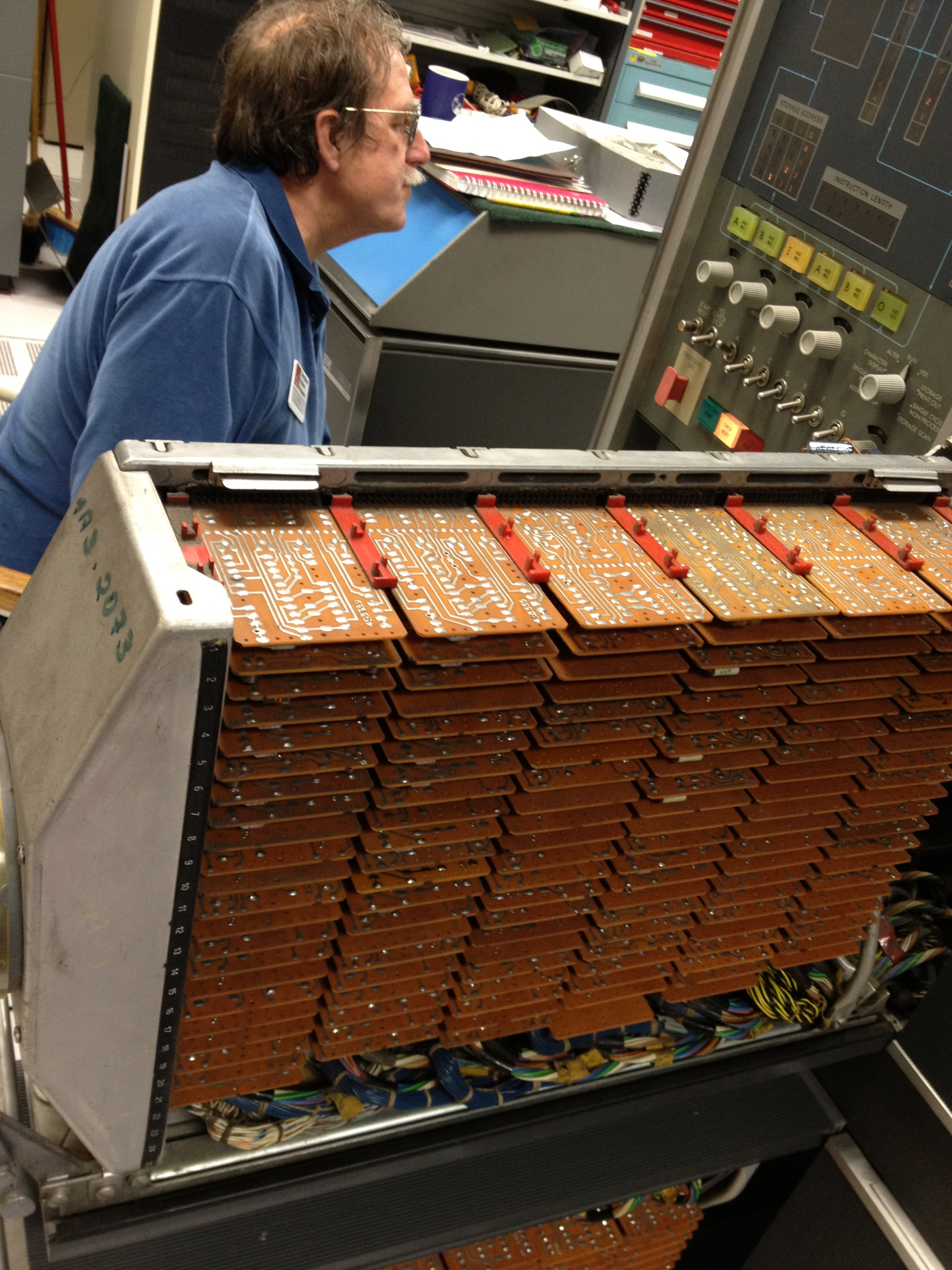
Closeup of a swing-out card cage (or gate in IBM parlance) showing some of the 1401's SMS circuit cards

Most of the logic circuitry of the 1401 is a type of diode–transistor logic (DTL), that IBM referred to as CTDL (Complemented Transistor Diode Logic). Other IBM circuit types were referred to as: Alloy (some logic, but mostly various non-logic functions, named for the germanium-alloy transistors used), CTRL (Complemented Transistor Resistor Logic, a type of resistor–transistor logic (RTL)). Later upgrades (e.g., the TAU-9 tape interface) use a faster type of DTL using "drift" transistors (a type of transistor invented by Herbert Kroemer in 1953) for their speed, that IBM referred to as SDTDL (Saturated Drift Transistor Diode Logic). Typical logic levels of these circuits were (S & U Level) high: 0 V to -0.5V, low: -6 V to -12 V; (T Level) high: 6 V to 1 V, low: -5.5 V to -6 V.

These circuits are constructed of discrete components (resistors, capacitors, transistors) mounted on single-sided paper-epoxy printed circuit boards either 2.5 by 4.5 inches (64 by 114 mm) with a 16-pin gold-plated edge connector (single wide) or 5.375 by 4.5 inches (136.5 by 114.3 mm) with two 16-pin gold-plated edge connectors (double wide), that IBM referred to as SMS cards (Standard Modular System). The amount of logic on one card is similar to that in one 7400 series SSI or simpler MSI package (e.g., three to five logic gates or a couple of flip-flops on a single-wide card up to about twenty logic gates or four flip-flops on a double-wide card).

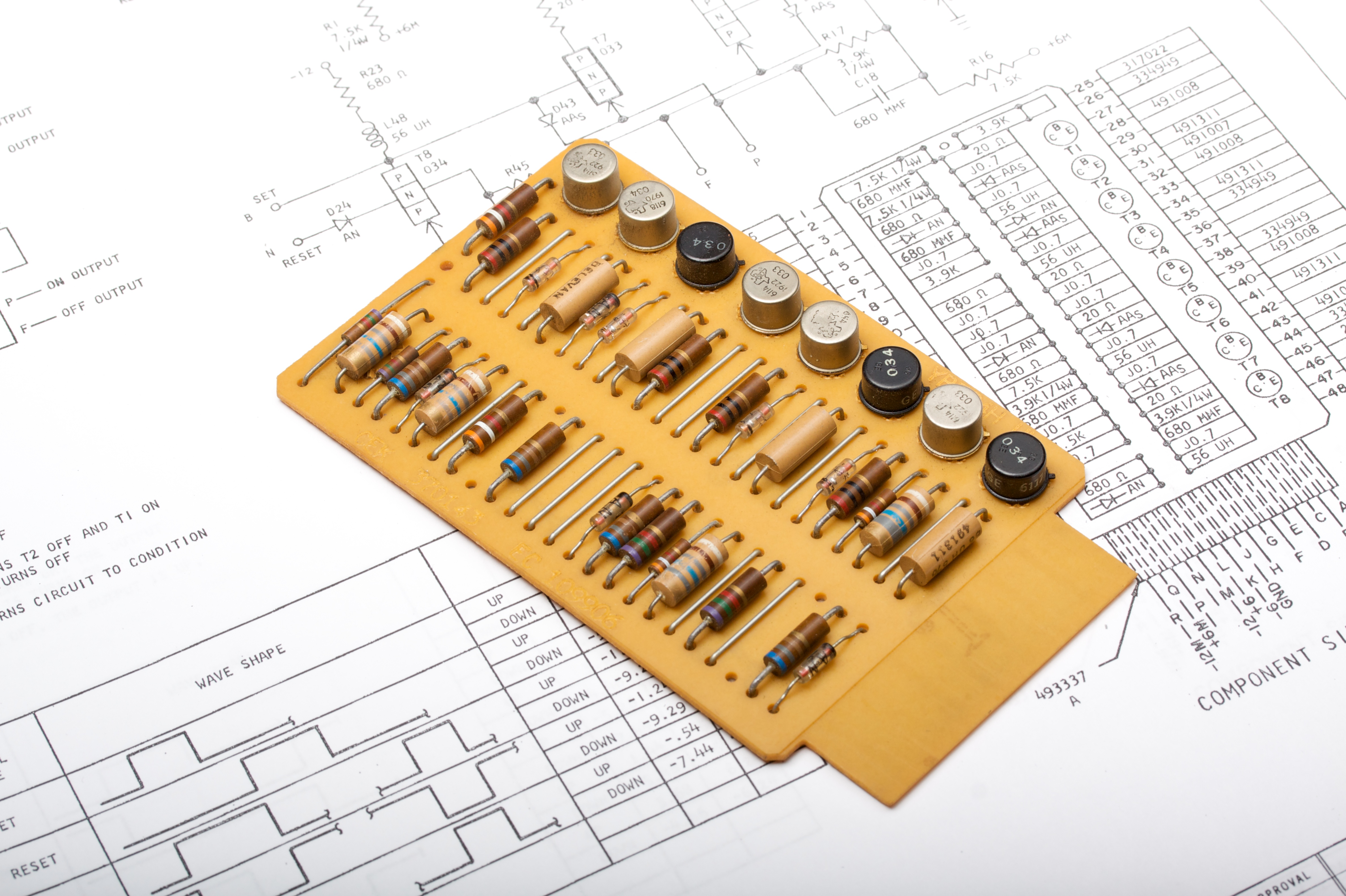
A single-width SMS card of the type used in the 1401

The SMS cards were inserted in sockets on hinged swing-out racks, that IBM referred to as gates.

The modules used were fairly delicate, compared to previous unit-record equipment, so IBM shipped them enclosed in a newly invented packing material, bubble wrap. This was one of the first widespread uses of this packing; it greatly impressed recipients, and brought great publicity to the material.

Like most machines of the day, the 1401 uses magnetic-core memory. The cores are about 1 mm in diameter and use a four-wire arrangement (x, y, sense, and inhibit). The memory is arranged in planes of 4000 cores each, each core storing one bit. A stack of eight such planes store the six data bits, word mark bit, and parity bit for 4000 memory locations. Together with eight additional planes with fewer cores on them for additional storage functions, this made up a 4000-character memory module. One such module is housed within the 1401's primary enclosure. Systems were commonly available with two, three, or four such modules. The additional modules are contained in an add-on box, the 1406 Core Memory Unit, which is about two feet square and three feet high.

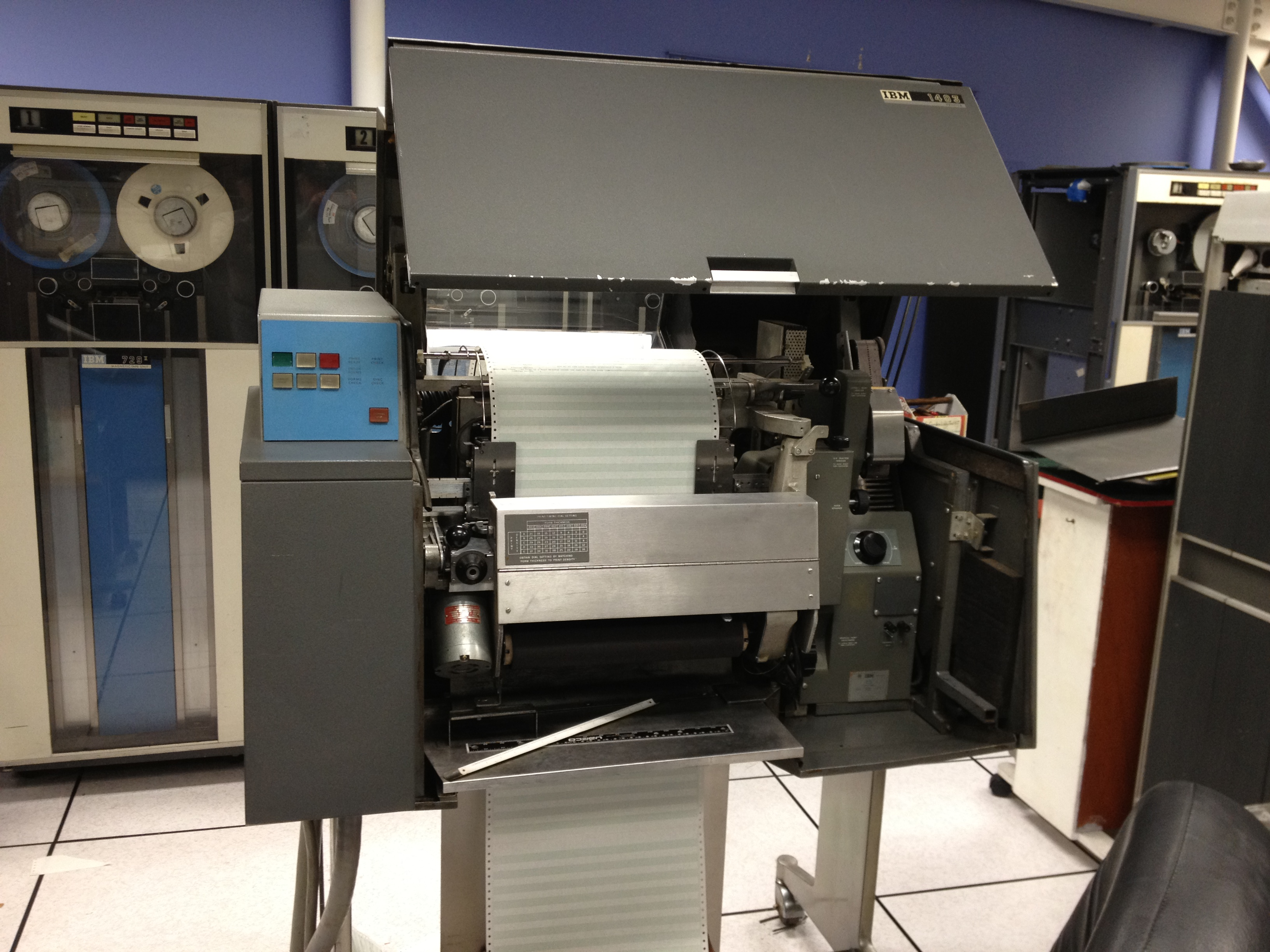
1403 line printer opened, with 729 tape drives in the background.

Operands in memory are accessed serially, one memory location at a time, and the 1401 can read or write one memory location within its basic cycle time of 11.5 microseconds.

All instruction timings are cited in multiples of this cycle time.

== IBM 1403 printer ==
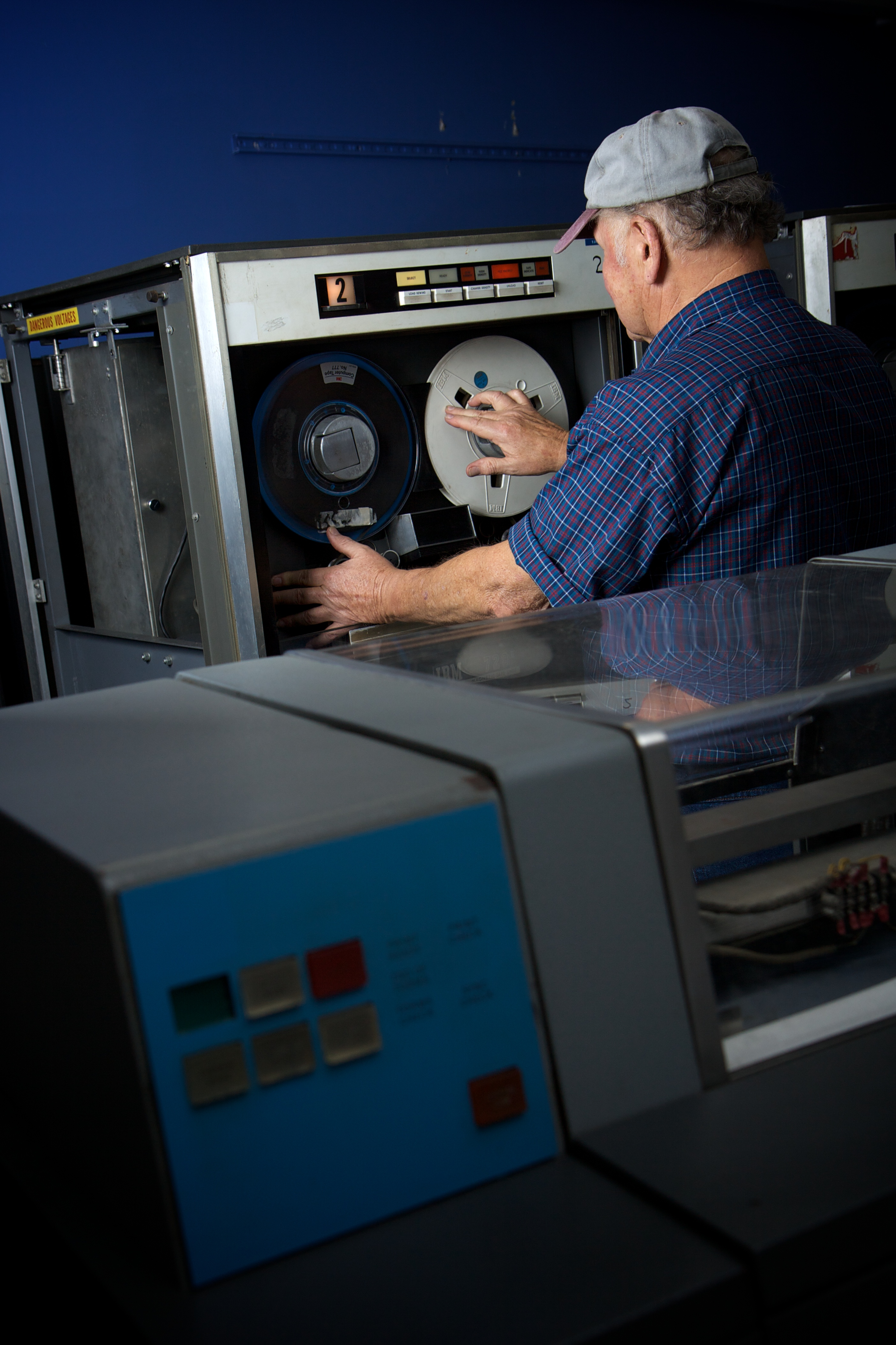
A reel of half-inch tape being loaded onto an IBM 729 tape drive. An IBM 1403 line printer is in the foreground.

The IBM 1403 printer was introduced in October 1959 with the 1401 Data Processing System. The printer was a completely new development.

== Software ==
IBM software for the 1401 included:

- 1401 Symbolic Programming System assembler.
- Autocoder on Tape, a more advanced assembler, required at least 4000-character memory and four tape drives.
- Autocoder on Disk, similar to, but not compatible with, Autocoder on Tape, required at least one 1311 disk drive.
- COBOL required at least 4000-character memory and four tape drives.
- FARGO (Fourteen-o-one Automatic Report Generation Operation), a predecessor of RPG, required at least 4000-character memory.
- FORTRAN II required at least 8000-character memory; the 1401 Fortran compiler is described in Haines, L.H. (1965), below. The Fortran compiler, to generate code for small memories, used a pioneering form of interpreted "p-code" although its programmers had no name for what it was that they did.
- FORTRAN IV required at least 12000-character memory and either four tape drives or at least one IBM 1311 disk drive.
- RPG (Report Program Generator); Basic RPG required at least 4000-character memory.

For the IBM Catalog of 1401 software, see IBM 1400 series.

== Character and op codes ==
The 1401's operation codes are single characters. In many cases, particularly for the more common instructions, the character chosen is mnemonic for the operation: A for add, B for branch, S for subtract, etc.

Table of character and op codes

The table is in Character Collating Sequence.

Note: If Word mark bit is set, then the C bit will be opposite of shown. The C bit is determined and checked automatically by the machine - normally it is of no concern to the programmers. The only way the C bit can be entered is by manually using the switches on the Auxiliary Console. A programmer might use these switches to make quick patches while debugging.

BCD Character	Print-A	Print-H	Card	BCD w/o M	Operation	Definition & Notes
Blank				C		
.	.	.	12–3–8	BA8 21	Halt	
⌑	⌑	)	12–4–8	CBA84	Clear Word Mark	Lozenge
[			12–5–8	BA84 1		
<			12–6–8	BA842		Less Than
⯒			12–7–8	CBA8421		Group Mark
&	&	+	12	CBA		
$	$	$	11–3–8	CB 8 21		
*	*	*	11–4–8	B 84		
]			11–5–8	CB 84 1		
;			11–6–8	CB 842		
Δ			11–7–8	B 8421		Delta (Mode Change)
-	-	-	11	B		
/	/	/	0–1	C A 1	Clear Storage	
,	,	,	0–3–8	C A8 21	Set Word Mark	
%	%	(	0–4–8	A84	Divide	Optional special feature.
ˠ			0–5–8	C A84 1		Word Separator
\			0–6–8	C A842		Left Oblique
⧻			0–7–8	A8421		Tape Segment Mark
ƀ	‡	‡	N/A 0	A		Cannot be read from card without a no-cost RPQ, in which case it is read as 8–2. (Note: The RPQ "Reader/Punch Card Code 8-2 and A-Bit Compatibility" (898148) causes the 1401 to read/punch the A bit as 8-2 for compatibility with the IBM 1410.) Punches as zero (or 8–2 with the RPQ). Blank with "even-parity" on tape.
#	#	=	3–8	8 21	Modify Address	Optional (requires more than 4000 characters of memory)
@	@	'	4–8	C 84	Multiply	Optional special feature.
:			5–8	84 1		
>			6–8	842		Greater Than
√			7–8	C 8421		Tape Mark
?	&	&	12–0	CBA8 2	Zero and Add	Plus Zero
A	A	A	12–1	BA 1	Add	
B	B	B	12–2	BA 2	Branch or Branch on Indicator	See "Modifiers for five-character Branch on Indicator (B) instruction" section
C	C	C	12–3	CBA 21	Compare	
D	D	D	12–4	BA 4	Move Numerical	(Bits)
E	E	E	12–5	CBA 4 1	Move Characters and Edit	
F	F	F	12–6	CBA 42	Control Carriage	(Printer)
G	G	G	12–7	BA 421		
H	H	H	12–8	BA8	Store B-Address Register	Optional special feature.
I	I	I	12–9	CBA8 1		
!	-	-	11–0	B 8 2	Zero and Subtract	Minus Zero
J	J	J	11–1	CB 1		
K	K	K	11–2	CB 2	Select Stacker and other device controls	See "Modifiers for Select Stacker (K) instruction" section
L	L	L	11–3	B 21	Load Characters to Word Mark	
M	M	M	11–4	CB 4	Move Characters to Word Mark	
N	N	N	11–5	B 4 1	No Operation	
O	O	O	11–6	B 42		
P	P	P	11–7	CB 421	Move Characters to Record or Group Mark	Optional special feature.
Q	Q	Q	11–8	CB 8	Store A-Address Register	Optional special feature.
R	R	R	11–9	B 8 1		
‡	‡	‡	0–2–8	A8 2		Record Mark
S	S	S	0–2	C A 2	Subtract	
T	T	T	0–3	A 21	Translate	(1460 only)
U	U	U	0–4	C A 4	Control Unit	(Tape)
V	V	V	0–5	A 4 1	Branch if Word Mark and/or Zone	
W	W	W	0–6	A 42	Branch if Bit Equal	Optional special feature.
X	X	X	0–7	C A 421	Move and Insert Zeros	Optional special feature.
Y	Y	Y	0–8	C A8	Move Zone	(Bits)
Z	Z	Z	0–9	A8 1	Move Characters and Suppress Zeros	
0	0	0	0	C 8 2		
1	1	1	1	1	Read a Card	
2	2	2	2	2	Write a Line	
3	3	3	3	C 21	Write and Read	
4	4	4	4	4	Punch a Card	
5	5	5	5	C 4 1	Read and Punch	
6	6	6	6	C 42	Write and Punch	
7	7	7	7	421	Write, Read, and Punch	
8	8	8	8	8	Start Read Feed	Optional special feature.
9	9	9	9	C 8 1	Start Punch Feed	Optional special feature.

Two of the instructions, Branch on Indicator (B) and Select Stacker (K), use a "modifier" operand.

=== Modifiers for five-character Branch on Indicator (B) instruction ===
The B opcode, if followed by a three-character operand, was a simple unconditional branch to the indicated address. If a fourth operand character was present (making five characters total including the opcode), this made it a conditional branch. This "modifier" character specified the condition to be tested.

BCD Character	Unit	Meaning
Blank	1401	Unconditional—no word mark needed in next character
1	1009	in run condition
	1011	punch in backspace operation
	1011	reader parity indicator on
	1231	auto select
	1285	error
	1412	control-check indicator on
	1418	late read
	1419	document to be read
	1428	late read or late reading mode change
	1445	printer error
	7340	hypertape unusual end
	7740	transmission complete with abnormal status
	DDC	transmission error
2	1009	buffer available
	1011	punch ready
	1011	reader ready
	1231	full buffer
	1285	end of line
	1412	reader-not-ready signal on
	1418	ready to engage
	1419	document under read head (PDS 4)
	1428	ready to engage
	7340	hypertape normal end
	7740	transmission complete successfully
	DDC	transmission ended by GMWM
3	1009	good transmission occurred
	1011	punch not ready to receive data
	1231	ready to read
	1285	reader transporting
	1412	read-check indicator on
	1418	document under selected read station
	1419	valid amount field
	1428	document under selected read station
	7340	hypertape control unit 7641 busy
	7740	receive request
	DDC	read request
4	1009	reply-bad indicator on
	1011	punch not ready to read
	1231	empty hopper
	1285	marked line
	1412	amount-field indicator on
	1419	valid process-control field
	7340	hypertape attention
	7740	7740 attention
	DDC	write request
5	1009	error reply acknowledgement
	1011	punch overextended
	1231	read error or overrun
	1285	header information
	1412	process-control indicator on
	1418	document end
	1419	valid account-number field
	1428	document end
	1445	printer busy
6	1009	program attention required
	1011	punch supply reel low or chad box full
	1231	timing mark check
	1285	ready to read a line
	1412	account-number indicator on
	1418	character on line
	1419	valid transit-number field
	1428	character on line
	1445	carriage busy
	DDC	write in progress
7	1009	end of message
	1285	reader ready
	1412	transit-number indicator on
	1418	empty hopper and transport (end of file)
	1419	valid serial-number field
	1428	empty hopper and transport (end of file)
	1445	carriage channel 9
	DDC	read in progress
8	1009	end of file
	1285	end of file
	1412	document-spacing-check indicator on
	1418	ready to read
	1419	auto-select
	1428	ready to read
	1448	carriage channel 12
	DDC	system A stopped
9	1403	carriage tape channel 9
0	1404	validity error
' or @	1403	carriage tape channel 12
>	1448	end of block
/	1401	unequal compare
S	1401	equal compare
T	1401	low compare
U	1401	high compare
V	1301	disk error
	1311	disk error
	1405	read or write parity check or read back check error
W	1301	wrong-length record
	1311	wrong-length record
	1405	wrong-length record
X	1301	unequal address compare
	1311	unequal address compare
	1405	unequal address compare
Y	1301	any disk-unit error condition
	1311	any disk-unit error condition
	1405	any disk-unit error condition
Z	1401	arithmetic overflow
‡	1403	printer error (record mark)
( or %	1401	process check with process check switch off
	1440	I/O check stop switch off
\	1301	access busy
	1311	access busy
J	1419	I/O channel-busy indicator
	TAU	tape busy
	SIO	serial input-output busy
K	TAU	end of reel (writing) or tape mark (reading)
L	TAU	tape error
N	1301	access inoperable
	1311	access inoperable
	1405	access inoperable
P	1403	printer busy
Q	1407	inquiry request
R	1403	carriage busy
!	1402	punch error
*	1407	inquiry clear
+ or &	1442	last card (Reader unit 2)
A	1402	last card if SS A is on
B	1401	SS B
	7340	hypertape attention response
C	1401	SS C
D	1401	SS D
E	1401	SS E
	7340	hypertape end response
F	1401	SS F
G	1401	SS G
H	1402	reader busy
I	1402	punch busy
?	1402	reader error
<	1448	early warning

=== Modifiers for Select Stacker (K) instruction ===
The Select Stacker (K) instruction sent commands to various devices. It was named for its relevance to the 1402 reader/punch.

BCD Character	Unit	Meaning
Blank	1401	set program activity recording at BBB only if A is, dd
1	1402	select last card read to stacker 1 if within 10 ms
2	1402	select last card read to stacker 8/2 if within 10 ms
4	1402	select previous card punched to stacker 4
8	1402	select previous card punched to stacker 8/2
= or #	1444	select previous card punched to stacker 2
L	1009	operate in load mode
$	1402	overlap on
A	1009	suppress 3-second alarm
C	DDC	read request
D	1009	set direction to receive
	DDC	write request
E	1009	set direction to transmit
	DDC	reset
F	1009	send EOF
.	1402	overlap off
)	1402	reset overlap

== 1401 culture ==
In October 2006, Icelandic avant-garde musician Jóhann Jóhannsson released the album IBM 1401, A User's Manual through music publisher 4AD. The concept is based upon work done in 1964 by his father, Jóhann Gunnarsson, chief maintenance engineer of one of the country's first computers, and Elías Daviðsson, one of the first programmers in the country. The album was originally written for a string quartet, organ and electronics and to accompany a dance piece by long-standing collaborator friend, Erna Ómarsdóttir. For the album recording, Jóhann has rewritten it for a sixty-piece string orchestra, adding a new final movement and incorporating electronics and vintage reel-to-reel recordings of a singing 1401 found in his father's attic.

More well-known are various demo programs to play music on transistor radios placed on the CPU and computer "art", mostly kitschy pictures printed using Xs and 0s on chain printers. Other programs would generate music by having the printer print particular groups/sequences of characters using the impact of the printer hammers to generate tones.

An IBM 1401 was the first computer introduced in Nepal for the census purpose in 1971. It took about one year to take the census of the country. At that time the population of Nepal was about 10,000,000.

== Truck-based portable version ==
A truck-based IBM 1401 configured in 1960 for military use was designated a portable computer, and nicknamed a DataMobile.

== See also ==
- IBM 1400 series
- Honeywell 200
- Bull Gamma 10

== Videos ==
- IBM 1401 System - 50th Anniversary in the Computer History Museum YouTube November 19, 2009
- IBM 1401 French Presentation with English Subtitles YouTube April 20, 2014
- IBM 1401 for the Roper Corporation YouTube May 14, 2015
- The IBM 1401 compiles and runs FORTRAN II YouTube February 2, 2018
