= Daitch–Mokotoff Soundex =

Phonetic algorithm

Daitch–Mokotoff Soundex (D–M Soundex) is a phonetic algorithm invented in 1985 by Jewish genealogists Gary Mokotoff and Randy Daitch. It is a refinement of the Russell and American Soundex algorithms designed to allow greater accuracy in matching of Slavic and Yiddish surnames with similar pronunciation but differences in spelling.

Daitch–Mokotoff Soundex is sometimes referred to as "Jewish Soundex" and "Eastern European Soundex", although the authors discourage use of these nicknames for the algorithm because the algorithm itself is independent of the fact that the motivation for creating the new system was the poor result of predecessor systems when dealing with Slavic and Yiddish surnames.

== Improvements ==
Improvements over the older Soundex algorithms include:

- Coded names are six digits long, resulting in greater search precision (traditional Soundex uses four characters)
- The initial character of the name is coded.
- Several rules in the algorithm encode multiple character n-grams as single digits (American and Russell Soundex do not handle multi-character n-grams)
- Multiple possible encodings can be returned for a single name (traditional Soundex returns only one encoding, even if the spelling of a name could potentially have multiple pronunciations)

== Examples ==
Some examples:

Surname	American Soundex	D–M Soundex
Peters	P362	739400, 734000
Peterson	P362	739460, 734600
Moskowitz	M232	645740
Moskovitz	M213	645740
Auerbach	A612	097500, 097400
Uhrbach	U612	097500, 097400
Jackson	J250	154600, 454600, 145460, 445460
Jackson-Jackson	J252	154664, 454664, 145466, 445466, 154646, 454646, 145464, 445464

== Beider–Morse Phonetic Name Matching Algorithm ==
To address the large number of false positive results generated by the D–M Soundex, Stephen P. Morse and Alexander Beider created the Beider–Morse Phonetic Name Matching algorithm. This new algorithm cuts down on false positives at the expense of some false negatives. A number of sites are offering the B–M soundex in addition to the D–M Soundex.
