= Avotaynu =

US Jewish genealogy magazine

- Editor: Sallyann Amdur Sack-Pikus
- Categories: Genealogy; Family history
- Frequency: Quarterly
- Publisher: Gary Mokotoff
- First issue: January 1985
- Final issue: Winter 2021
- Company: Avotaynu
- Country: United States
- Based in: New Haven, Connecticut U.S.
- Language: English
- Website: Avotaynu.com
- ISSN: 0882-6501

Avotaynu: The International Review of Jewish Genealogy was a magazine that focused on Jewish genealogy and family history published by Avotaynu Inc. (New Haven, Connecticut). It was established in 1985. An index to the first 24 volumes is available. The word avotaynu (Hebrew: אבותינו) literally means 'our fathers', but has come to mean 'our ancestors'.

The Consolidated Jewish Surname Index (CJSI) is Avotaynu's metasearch engine which points to 42 different specialized data banks.

Avotaynu Inc. also published books on the same topic by such authors as Alexander Beider and Warren Blatt.
