= George Andrews Moriarty Jr. =

American historian (1883–1968)

- Born: February 14, 1883; Newport, Rhode Island
- Died: July 12, 1968 (aged 85); York Harbor, Maine
- Education: B.A., M.A., LL.B, Harvard University
- Occupations: Diplomat, Lawyer, Genealogist
- Spouse(s): Olga Gillming (m. 1908; div. 1911) Louisa Dittemore (m. 1930; died 1968)

George Andrews Moriarty Jr. (1883–1968), called G. Andrews Moriarty in most of his published work, was an American genealogist from Newport, Rhode Island. He was born in Newport on February 14, 1883, the only son of George Andrews Moriarty and Mary Ann Sheffield. His ancestor, John Moriarty, emigrated from Ireland in 1777 and settled in Salem, Massachusetts. George attended St. George's School in Newport, and then did his undergraduate work at Harvard University where he earned an A.B. in 1905, cum laude. He then attended Christ Church at the University of Oxford in England where he specialized in historical studies, following which he returned to Harvard to earn an M.A. in 1907.

Moriarty went to work for the U. S. State Department in the foreign service, and served in consular and secretarial roles in Fiume, Italy; Mexico City; and Guatemala. He returned to Harvard once again to study law, and received his LL.B. in 1916. He practiced law in Providence, Rhode Island and Boston, Massachusetts for over a decade, which time also included a year in the U.S. Army at the end of World War I when he was a captain in military intelligence. In 1927 he ended his career in law and devoted the remainder of his life to historical and genealogical pursuits.

Moriarty's interest in genealogy began when he was young, and in 1899, at the age of 16, he became a member of the New England Historic Genealogical Society. In 1912 he became a member of the society's Council, in 1916 was named the Corresponding Secretary and in 1918 became chairman of the Committee on English and Foreign Research. He also served as the chairman for publications for 25 years and was on the Committee for Heraldry from 1920 to 1949.

Making his first contribution to the New England Historical and Genealogical Register in 1912, Moriarty submitted 134 articles to that journal over the next 54 years, most of them dealing with English feudal families. In addition, he became a contributing editor of The American Genealogist, published by Donald Lines Jacobus, and from 1932 to 1965, he submitted more than 75 articles to this journal. These articles included a series of additions and corrections to John Osborne Austin's Genealogical Dictionary of Rhode Island. He also contributed to more than a dozen other American and English journals, as well as writing genealogical notes in the Boston Evening Transcript for a period of 30 years. Moriarty was a fellow of the American Society of Genealogists and of the Society of Genealogists, London and the Society of Antiquaries, London. He was also the founder and first president of the Descendants of the Illegitimate Sons and Daughters of the Kings of Britain.

In his personal life, Moriarty was twice married. He was first married in London in 1908 to Olga Gillming of Budapest, Hungary; they were divorced three years later. He was married a second time in 1930 to the Countess Louise de Alfau, the daughter of John V. Dittemore of New York. She died in the summer of 1968, and Moriarty died less than two weeks later, on 12 July 1968, at the York Harbor Nursing Home in York Harbor, Maine.

In 1986 the National Genealogical Society instituted a Hall of Fame for individuals who had made significant strides in the field of genealogy. In 1990 G. Andrews Moriarty was inducted into that prestigious group, having been nominated by the Genealogical Society of Utah and the American Society of Genealogists.
