= Eugene Zubrinsky =

American genealogist

Eugene Cole Zubrinsky FASG
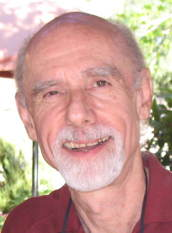
- Zubrinsky in 2008
- Born: 8 January 1941 (age 85); Los Angeles, California, USA
- Occupation: Genealogist
- Writing career
- Period: 1987–

Eugene Cole Zubrinsky is an American genealogist focusing on colonial southern New England families. He is a Fellow of the American Society of Genealogists and lives in Ojai, California.

== Background ==
As stated in his ASG biography, Zubrinsky is a former high jumper (1964 Olympic trials finalist), community college sociology instructor, and jazz musician. He won a silver medal in the high jump at the 1961 Maccabiah Games in Israel and gold in 1973.

Zubrinsky played the trumpet professionally most of his life. In 1978, when the CSUN "A" Big-Band Jazz Ensemble recorded their album Let's Eat Cactus, he played the flugelhorn solo on "Crimp Cut" (see reference note for link).

== Genealogy career ==
After retiring from Ventura College in 1987, he gradually developed an interest in genealogy, publishing his first journal article in 1992.

In 2008, he authored a series of twelve online sketches on the two primary colonial Carpenter families, of Rehoboth, Mass., and Providence, R.I., which form the definitive source of accurate information about the early American generations and English origins of those families. In 2014, he published a highly detailed volume pertaining to his Russian-Jewish paternal ancestry, and in 2016, an extensive genealogy of the Redways, one of his mother's ancestral families.

In 2026, he published an extensive two-volume effort after an eleven-year genealogy project: An Ancestral Line to James Cole of Plymouth, 1633, and 216 Related Lineages.

Zubrinsky was elected a Fellow of the American Society of Genealogists in 2010, an honor limited to 50 living persons.

He has published over 30 scholarly articles in premier journals such as the New England Historic Genealogical Society's flagship quarterly publication The New England Historical and Genealogical Register and the American Genealogist, founded by Donald Lines Jacobus.

== Selected publications ==
- "The Parents (and Further Ancestry) of John Cole of Rehoboth, Massachusetts, Husband of Mercy Perry and Elizabeth Brown", The American Genealogist, 86(2012):40–45.
- "The Miles Family of Lancaster County, Pennsylvania; Newberry County, South Carolina; and Miami County, Ohio: With Extensive Coverage of the Film–Pioneer Miles Brothers", Ohio Genealogical Society Quarterly 53(2013):3–12, 182–95, 304–18, 377–88.
- "Julian Adcocke, Wife of John1 Sutton of Hingham and Rehoboth, Massachusetts, and Their Family", New England Historical and Genealogical Register 167(2013):7–14.
- "A Fresh Look at the Parentage of Mayflower Passenger Joan (Hurst) (Rogers) Tilley: With Her Mother’s Identity and Family of Origin", The American Genealogist 85(2011):1–8.
- "Townsmen and Selectmen: Variations of Title and Function in Plymouth Colony", The American Genealogist 84(2010):50–51.
- "The Immigration and Marriage of William1 Carpenter of Amesbury, Wiltshire, and Providence, Rhode Island", New England Historical and Genealogical Register 164(2010):36–40, 296–97 (with addition[s] and/or correction[s] hereafter cited).
- "The Immigration and Early Whereabouts in America of Thomas1 Stanton of Connecticut: Challenging the Conventional Wisdom", The American Genealogist 81(2006):263–73.
- "John2 Cole and Family of Plymouth and Swansea, Massachusetts, and Portsmouth, Rhode Island: With Additional Corrections to the Cole Literature", The American Genealogist 81(2006):122–32, 238–45.
- "Thomas1 Stanton of Connecticut and the Longbridge Tradition: An Old Dogma’s Demise (Again),” The American Genealogist 81(2006):48–52.
- "Three John Carpenters: A Chain of Mistaken Identities", New England Historical and Genealogical Register 159(2005):43–53, 361–62 (a&c); 163(2009):297 (a&c).
- "Abiah3 Carpenter of Warwick, Rhode Island, and His Family: With Additional Material Concerning William1 Carpenter of Providence, Rhode Island, and William2 Carpenter of Rehoboth, Massachusetts", New England Historical and Genealogical Register 159(2005):54–68, 362–64 (a&c); 161(2007):300 (a&c); 163(2009):297–98 (a&c).
- "The Penn(e)ys of Harwich, Massachusetts, and Upstate New York", New York Genealogical and Biographical Record 133(2002):83–98, 201–16, 293 (a&c); 134(2003):304–5 (a&c).
- "The Redway/Radway Family of Putney, Vermont: A Branch of the Rehoboth, Massachusetts, Redways", New England Historical and Genealogical Register 154(2000):446–58.
- "Deacon John1 Warfield and His Family of Medfield and Mendon, Massachusetts: With Proof of the Paternity of Deacon Samuel2 Warfield", The American Genealogist 73(1998):11–21; 76(2001):226 (a&c).
- "'To Say It Doesn’t Make It So': Clues to the Probable Identity of the Wife of Jonathan2 Bliss of Rehoboth, Massachusetts", New England Historical and Genealogical Register 151(1997):31–37; 159(2005):361–62 (a&c).
- "Samuel4 Redway of Rehoboth, Massachusetts: His Wife and Later Life", New England Historical and Genealogical Register 150(1996):311–14.
- "The Family of William2 Carpenter of Rehoboth, Massachusetts: With the English Origin of the Rehoboth Carpenters", The American Genealogist 70(1995):193–204.
- "The Hammonds of Rehoboth and Swansea, Massachusetts", New England Historical and Genealogical Register 149(1995):211–29; 150(1996):216–19 (a&c); 164(2010):294 (a&c).
- "Elizabeth Bartram, Wife of (1) William Hammond Sr. of Rehoboth and Swansea and (2) Joseph2 Fiske of Lynn and Swansea, Mass.,” New England Historical and Genealogical Register 149(1995):230–43; 150(1996):214 (a&c).
- "Joanna Hildreth, Wife of Captain James3 Redway of Rehoboth, Massachusetts: How Much Circumstantial Evidence Is Enough?” New England Historical and Genealogical Register 146(1992):337–42.
- An Ancestral Line to James Cole of Plymouth, 1633, and 216 Related Lineages, 2 vols. (Ojai, Calif.; the author, 2026).
