= Peter Wilson Coldham =

British genealogist (1926–2012)

Peter Wilson Coldham FASG FSG
- Born: 25 November 1926; Wandsworth, London, England
- Died: 2 September 2012; Greater London, England
- Occupation: Genealogist

Peter Wilson Coldham, FASG (1926 – 2012 in London), was a British genealogist. He was noted as a "distinguished scholar of colonial American immigration."

== Life ==
In a genealogical format, his basic lineage is listed as; Peter Wilson Coldham-7 (Frederick Wilson Coldham-6, Henry Wilson Coldham-5, Henry James Coldham-4, Daniel Coldham-3, Daniel Coldham-2, Daniel Coldham-1).

He was the son of Frederick Wilson Coldham and Grace Clara Cutler. He later married Paulette Nagle (1928–2012) on 4 July 1953 in Purley, Surrey, England and had four children. He wrote over 26 books and multiple monographs and magazine articles, including many standard works on Anglo-American genealogy.

After serving in the far east in the Royal Navy in the last year of the Second World War, Coldham joined the British Foreign Office and was posted to the British embassy in Belgrade as Information Officer 1954–1956. He subsequently worked at the UK government's Central Office of Information (COI) in London 1956-1987. In retirement he frequently worked at the British Public Record Office, now known as The National Archives, where he discovered unpublished material on the early American colonists. His resulting articles published in the National Genealogical Society Quarterly (NGSQ) led to his recognition and several awards of excellence. He pioneered the then neglected field of English convict transports to America and indentured servants.

His documentation and writing of the book Passengers and Ships to America, 1618–1668 was cited by author Meredith B. Colket in 2002 as, "the most important addition to our knowledge of early New England that has appeared in over a century."

== Awards ==
Coldham was awarded the Julian Bickersteth memorial medal in 1991. He was a Fellow of the American Society of Genealogists (FASG) and Fellow of the Society of Genealogists (FSG).

"Peter Wilson Coldham has died, and the world of genealogical research has lost a remarkable man."

== Works ==
=== Important works ===
The Complete Book of Emigrants in Bondage, 1614-1775

Between 1614 and 1775 more than 50,000 English men, women, and children were sentenced to be deported to the American colonies for crimes ranging from the theft of a handkerchief to bigamy or highway robbery and sold as indentured servants for from 7 to 14 years depending upon the crime against the crown. After years of painstaking research, the names of nearly all those sentenced to penal transportation were extracted from official court records by Peter Coldham and published in the landmark work The Complete Book of Emigrants in Bondage in 1988 and its Supplement in 1992, forming the largest and most complete passenger list of its kind ever published. From this unexpected source the researcher at last had the means of learning the names of the persons transported to the colonies, the charges against them, the dates and places of sentencing, the ship names, and the places of arrival in the colonies.

Supplement to The Complete Book of Emigrants in Bondage, 1614-1775

The original volume of Emigrants in Bondage published in 1988 acknowledged that there were some notable omissions from the list of transported felons then printed, which remained to be researched and remedied. The Supplement of 1992 began to supply the omissions, but with the publication of More Emigrants in Bondage, Mr. Coldham closed the remaining gaps. Altogether there are some 9,000 new and amended records in this important new work, which is arranged and annotated in the same way as the parent volume. To the original list of 50,000 records, these additions come as a windfall, arising from the availability of previously closed archival resources and the re-examination of conventional transportation records such as Assize Court records, Circuit Court records, and the quaintly named Sheriffs' Cravings, to which can be added newspapers and printed memoirs.

The addition of 9,000 records to the canon makes this the most important list of ships' passengers to be published in years. This book has contributed to the discussion of the peopling of colonial America, and is used to identify ancestors of the modern inhabitants of the country.

=== Works include ===
- The Complete Book of Emigrants, 1607-1660
- The Complete Book of Emigrants, 1661-1699
- The Complete Book of Emigrants, 1700-1750
- The Complete Book of Emigrants, 1751-1776
- The Complete Book of Emigrants in Bondage, 1614-1775
- Supplement to The Complete Book of Emigrants in Bondage, 1614-1775
- American Migrations 1765-1799. The lives, times, and families of colonial Americans who remained loyal to the British Crown before, during and after the Revolutionary War, as related in their own words and through their correspondence
- Child Apprentices in America from Christ's Hospital, London, 1617-1778
- The Bristol Registers of Servants Sent to Foreign Plantations, 1654-1686
- Emigrants from England to the American Colonies, 1773-1776
- Emigrants in Chains. A Social History of Forced Emigration to the Americas of Felons, Destitute Children, Political and Religious Non-Conformists, Vagabonds, Beggars and Other Undesirables, 1607–1776
- English Adventurers and Emigrants, 1609-1660. Abstracts of Examinations in the High Court of Admiralty with Reference to Colonial America
- English Estates of American Colonists. American Wills and Administrations in the Prerogative Court of Canterbury, 1610-1699
- English Estates of American Colonists. American Wills and Administrations in the Prerogative Court of Canterbury, 1700-1799
- English Estates of American Settlers. American Wills and Administrations in the Prerogative Court of Canterbury, 1800-1858
- American Wills Proved in London, 1611-1775
- American Wills and Administrations in the Prerogative Court of Canterbury, 1610-1857
