= Douglas Richardson =

American genealogist, historian, lecturer, and author

Douglas Charles Richardson
- Born: April 16, 1951 (age 75); Sacramento, California
- Education: University of California, Santa Barbara
- Occupation: Genealogist
- Parents: Wayne H. Richardson; Joan Elizabeth Kercheval

Douglas Charles Richardson (born April 16, 1951, Sacramento, California) is an American genealogist, historian, lecturer, and author based in Salt Lake City in Utah. He has written extensively on the genealogy of medieval English gentry families and English royalty.

== Early life and career ==
Richardson was born April 16, 1951, in Sacramento, California, to Wayne H. Richardson (1917-2003) and his wife Joan Elizabeth nee Kercheval (1917-1991). He took a B.A. degree in History from the University of California Santa Barbara, and a M.A. degree in History from the University of Wisconsin-Madison. As a schoolteacher of American History he held positions at El Reno Junior College, in El Reno, Oklahoma, and at Hillsdale Free Will Baptist College, in Oklahoma City, Oklahoma.

He was Contributing Editor of The American Genealogist and was formerly a member of the Santa Barbara Genealogical Society and of the Connecticut Society of Genealogists.

== Publications ==
=== Major books ===
- Douglas Richardson & Kimball G. Everingham & David Faris (2004). Plantagenet Ancestry: A Study in Colonial and Medieval Families. Genealogical Publishing, Baltimore, Maryland. OCLC 713038076.

The book seeks to identify all the early American colonists whose ancestry can be traced back to the English monarchs.

- Douglas Richardson & Kimball G. Everingham (2011). Magna Carta Ancestry: A Study in Colonial and Medieval Families. OCLC 713038108.

Expanded 2011 Edition, Vols. 1, 2, 3 & 4, 2011.

- Douglas Richardson & Kimball G. Everingham (2013). Royal Ancestry: A Study in Colonial & Medieval Families. Salt Lake City, Utah. OCLC 840828655.

Vols. 1, 2, 3, 4, 5 & 2013. This book lists descents from the early Kings of England, France, and Scotland for over 250 persons who emigrated from the British Isles to the North American colonies in the 17th century. The book includes the above "Magna Carta Ancestry: A Study in Colonial and Medieval Families" and "Plantagenet Ancestry: A Study in Colonial and Medieval Families" plus new information.

=== Other books ===
- Douglas Richardson (1969). Alpheus Richardson: His Ancestors and Descendants. not known. OCLC 895183781.
- Douglas Richardson (1974). Van Winkle--Martin--Barkley family Bible records, 1746-1928. unknown. OCLC 866003940.
- Richardson, Douglas C[harles] (1984). The Eno and Enos Family in America: Descendants of James Eno of Windsor, Conn. [2nd edition]. Bethany, Okla.: D. C. Richardson. OCLC 14173526.
- Douglas C. Richardson (1987). Agnes (Harris) Spencer Edwards (1604-ca.1680), Wife Successively of William Spencer and William Edwards, Both of Hartford, Connecticut. Bethany, Okla.: D. C. Richardson. OCLC 40659088.
- Sarchet, C[yrus] P[arkinson] B[eatty], James C. Sarchet & Douglas [Charles] Richardson. (1989). The Genealogy of the Sarchet Family from the Island of Guernsey to Cambridge, Ohio in 1806. Bethany, Okla.: D. C. Richardson. OCLC 866618463.

A reprinting of three publications with a fourth part by Douglas Richardson.

- Douglas Richardson (1995). The English ancestry of the Merwin and Tinker families of New England. OCLC 42415816.

Off-print from NEHGR article

=== Contributed books ===
- Frederick Lewis Weis, Walter Lee Sheppard & William R. Beall (1999). "The Magna Charta Sureties, 1215: The Barons Named in the Magna Charta, 1215, and Some of Their Descendants who Settled in America during the Early Colonial Years. 5th edition". Genealogical Publishing of Baltimore, MD. OCLC 607298496.

Lines 16D, 22, 59A, 90A and 101A contributed by Douglas Richardson.

=== Articles ===
The New England Historical and Genealogical Register (NEHGR)

- Richardson, Douglas (1989). "The Riddlesdale Alias Loker Family of Bures Saint Mary, Suffolk, England, and Sudbury, Massachusetts". NEHGR (143).
- Richardson, Douglas (April 1994). "The Ancestry of Dorothy Stapleton, First Wife of Thomas Nelson of Rowley, Massachusetts, with a Provisional Royal Line". NEHGR (148): 130–140.
- Richardson, Douglas (July 1994). "A Royal Ancestry for Mary (Cooke) Talcott of Hartford, Connecticut". NEHGR (148): 255–258.
- Richardson, Douglas (1995). "The English ancestry of the Merwin and Tinker families of New England". NEHGR (149).
- Richardson, Douglas (July 1997). "The Tenney Family of Lincolnshire and Rowley, Massachusetts". NEHGR (151): 603.
- Faris, David; Richardson, Douglas (April 1998). "The Origin of Agatha - The Debate Continues: The Parents of Agatha, Wife of Edward The Exile". NEHGR (152): 606.
- Smith, Dean Crawford; Richardson, Douglas (October 1998). "English Ancestry of Nathaniel Heaton of Boston, Mass., and of His Nephew, James Heaton of New Haven, Connecticut". NEHGR (152): 608.
- Richardson, Douglas (January 1999). "The English Origin and Ancestry of the Parker Brothers of Massachusetts and of Their Probable Aunt, Sarah Parker, Wife of Edward Converse". NEHGR (153): 609.
- Richardson, Douglas (April 2000). "Plantagenet Ancestry of Edward Rainsford (1609-1680) of Boston". NEHGR (164): 614.

The American Genealogist (TAG)

- Richardson, Douglas (October 1992). "The Mother of Michael Humphrey of Windsor, Connecticut". TAG. 67 (4): 242.
- Richardson, Douglas (January 1993). "The English Origin of John Eaton (1590-1668) of Salisbury and Haverhill, Massachusetts". TAG. 68 (1): 48–54.
- Richardson, Douglas (July 1995). "The English Origin of the Lakin Family of Reading and Groton, Massachusetts". TAG. 70 (3): 142–148.

Heritage Quest Magazine (HQM)

- Richardson, Douglas (January 2003). "Plantagenet Ancestry". HQM. 19 (1): 36–39.

The New York Genealogical and Biographical Record (NYGBR)

Foundations

=== Website ===
- [.royalancestry[.]net www[.]royalancestry[.]net] - Royal Ancestry Publications

== Ancestors ==
Ancestors of Douglas Richardson

16. Manning Richardson
8. Alpheus Richardson (1830-1915)
17. Lucinda Eno
4. Newton Eno Richardson (1878-1935)
18. Alexander Thompson Taylor
9. Avyette Taylor (1848-1908)
19. Lovisa Bruce
2. Wayne H. Richardson (1917-2003)
5. Laura Lucinda Shearer (1877-1961)
1. Douglas Charles Richardson (1951-)
24. Reuben Kercheval
12. Howard Douglas Kercheval
25. Margaret White Brodie
6. Elbert Merwin Kercheval
13. Martha Stewart Barkley
3. Joan Elizabeth Kerchevval (1917-1991)
7. Elizabeth Lenniker Fennie
