= Henry Z Jones Jr. =

American singer-songwriter

Hank Jones
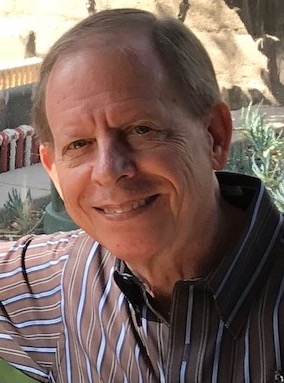
- Hank Jones (2018)
- Born: June 3, 1940 (age 86); Oakland, California, U.S.
- Occupations: Actor; musician; genealogist; author
- Years active: 1961–1981, 1981–present
- Spouses: Deanna Joy Quintel (divorced) Lori Spring (divorced) Bonnie Lublin Aho (m. 1988)
- Children: 1
- Website: hankjones.com

Henry Z Jones Jr. (born June 3, 1940) is an American actor, musician, genealogist and author. He became known to a wide audience primarily through his appearances in Disney films.

== Life ==
Jones was born in Oakland, California and raised in San Leandro, California. He attended San Leandro High School and Stanford University majoring in communications. While in school he was singer in the band Hank Jones & The White Bucks, as a student he formed the duo Hank and Dean with his schoolfriend Dean Kay. They had their first record contract with RCA Victor in 1961. Later albums were recorded with Capitol and Epitomé Records. Hank and Dean got into television entertainment in 1962 and performed in ABC's Tennessee Ernie Ford Show. Kay was drafted in 1963 and the duo dissolved. Kay became a music publishing executive; Jones's emphasis shifted towards television entertainment and show-business. He starred in eight Disney films in the 1960s and 1970s.

On television, Jones had roles in My Three Sons (1960) with Fred MacMurray and William Frawley and in The Patty Duke Show (1963). He was featured in many comedy programs of the 1960s and 1970s, including Petticoat Junction (1963), Love, American Style (1969), The Jeffersons (1975), The Love Boat (1977), Mork & Mindy (1978) and many others. One of his most interesting roles was playing the twin brother of the Beatle Ringo Starr (after five hours of makeup every day) in a TV version of Mark Twain's Prince & The Pauper. Over the years, Jones was featured in countless television commercials, some of which have won awards (for MacDonalds, Hai Karate After Shave, Honda, and Dial Soap) and were shown on NBC's World's Greatest Commercials. A longtime songwriter and member of ASCAP, Jones's song Midnight Swinger recorded by Mel Tormé in 1970 obtained a preliminary Grammy nomination. In 1986 Jones featured three times as the champion on the popular TV quiz show Jeopardy!

In 1981 he withdrew from the entertainment industry and increasingly turned to genealogy, his hobby from childhood. One of his ancestors was Abraham Bergmann, who emigrated in 1709 with a group of German Palatines from Iggelheim from the Electoral Palatinate to County Limerick in Ireland. Jones studied the records of the entire group of emigrants intensively and over the years published several books on this subject, first The Palatine Families of Ireland (1965, 2nd expanded edition 1990), then his main work The Palatine Families of New York (2 volumes, 1985). The work documents the origins and whereabouts of the 847 Palatinate families settled in New York State and won the 1986 Donald Lines Jacobus Award for the best genealogical work and the Award of Merit from the National Genealogical Society. Jones was elected as one of the 50 fellows to the American Society of Genealogists, of which he later became president. He was also a fellow of the New York Genealogical and Biographical Society.

From his second marriage he has a daughter Amanda. He lives in San Diego with his wife, Bonnie.

== Legacy ==
In 2026, Jones was the subject of the feature-length documentary Beyond Godolphin: The Hank Jones Story, directed by Disney animator Kevin MacLean. The film had its world premiere at the Prescott Film Festival on July 17, 2026.

== Filmography (selection) ==
- 1965: Girl Happy as Boy (uncredited)
- 1965: Village of the Giants as Chuck
- 1967: The Young Warriors as Fairchild
- 1968: Blackbeard's Ghost as Gudger Larkin
- 1970: Tora! Tora! Tora! as Davey - Student Pilot in Biplane
- 1970: The Love Doctors as Rex
- 1971: The Barefoot Executive as Stan (uncredited)
- 1971: The Million Dollar Duck as Commencement Speaker (uncredited)
- 1974: Herbie Rides Again as Sir Lancelot
- 1976: No Deposit, No Return as Banana Cop
- 1976: The Shaggy D.A. as Policeman
- 1978: The Cat from Outer Space as Officer

== Works ==
- The Palatine Families of New York - 1710: A Supplement
- A few more left!
- Arrival Time
- German origins of Jost Hite, Virginia pioneer, 1685–1761
- Memories: the "show-biz" part of my life
- Psychic roots: serendipity & intuition in genealogy
- Story of Isaac Hillman
- The Palatine Families of Ireland
- The Palatine Families of New York
- More Palatine families: some immigrants to the middle colonies 1717–1776 and their European origins, plus new discoveries on German families who arrived in Colonial New York in 1710
- The Palatine Families of New York 1710: A supplement
- Westerwald to America: some 18th century German immigrants
