= Milton Rubincam =

American genealogist (1909–1997)

- Born: March 26, 1909; Philadelphia, Pennsylvania, U.S.
- Died: September 9, 1997 (aged 88); Washington, D.C., U.S.
- Resting place: Arlington Cemetery, Drexel Hill, Pennsylvania
- Occupation: Genealogist
- Spouse: Priscilla Teasdale (1935–1997)
- Children: John; Milton III; David
- Parent(s): Milton Rubincam; Minnie Rubincam

Milton Rubincam (March 26, 1909 – September 9, 1997) was an American genealogist. He served as a member of the American Society of Genealogists, as well as its president from 1961 to 1964. He was also a member of the National Genealogical Society, serving as president of the organization from 1945 to 1949 as well as 1953 to 1954.

== Biography ==
=== Early life and education ===
Milton Rubincam was born on March 26, 1909, at 5330 Catherine Street in West Philadelphia, Pennsylvania, the only child of Milton and Minnie Rubincam. He was educated at the Harrity-Lee School and the Anna Howard Shaw Junior High School, and later going to the Wesley Avenue and Central Avenue Schools in Ocean City, New Jersey, but childhood illnesses hindered his progress. He went to high school at the Ocean City High School, graduating in June 1930. During his childhood, he would gain an interest in genealogy from his uncle, who told him stories about the Rubincam family. In September 1930, he would begin studying journalism at Temple University, but he left the university before graduating.

=== Career and genealogical research ===
In 1934, Milton Rubincam moved to Washington, D.C., with Priscilla Teasdale, his future wife, and the next year he started working as a clerk-typist on a Works Progress Administration project, the start of his career as a federal employee. In 1938, he joined the National Genealogical Society, serving as corresponding secretary from 1938 to 1942, associate editor from 1941 to 1957, vice president from 1943 to 1944, councilor from 1944 to 1945, as president for two terms, 1945-48 and 1953–54, and as an editor from 1957 to 1962. In 1957, he was also elected as a fellow of the group. In 1941, Milton was chosen as a fellow for the American Society of Genealogists, serving as vice president of the organization from 1946 to 1949 and 1959 to 1961, secretary-treasurer from 1951 to 1952, and president from 1961 to 1964. In 1972, Rubincam retired from his position as chief of security for the foreign operations office at the Commerce Department to become a full-time genealogist. During his lifetime, he contributed approximately 150 genealogical articles to journals such as the National Genealogical Society Quarterly, The American Genealogist, The New England Historical and Genealogical Register, as well as many other periodicals.

=== Marriage and children ===
Milton Rubincam married Priscilla Teasdale in 1935, and they had three sons: John (1941–2015), Milton III (1944–2019)), and David (born 1947).

=== Death and afterward ===
Milton Rubincam died in Washington, D.C., on September 9, 1997, at the age of 88. He was buried in Arlington Cemetery, Drexel Hill, Pennsylvania.

== Works ==
- Miscellaneous Papers Relating to the History of the Rubincam-Revercomb Family. Washington D.C, 1959. (OCLC 1157119153)
- A Bibliographical Record, 1935-1960. United States, Pennsylvania Historical Junto, 1960. (OCLC 865972877, ISBN 978-1258323035)
- Pitfalls in Genealogical Research. Turner Publishing Company, 1987. (ISBN 9780916489281)
- Evidence, an Exemplary Study: A Craig Family Case History. United States, National Genealogical Society, 1981. (ISBN 9780915156498)
- Genealogy: A Selected Bibliography. United States, Banner Press, 1983. (ISBN 9780317138245)

== Recognition ==
In 2003, Milton Rubincam was elected to the National Genealogy Hall of Fame.

== See also ==
- American Society of Genealogists
- National Genealogical Society
