= Donald Lines Jacobus =

American genealogist and historian (1887–1970)

- Born: Donald Lines Jacobus; 3 October 1887; New Haven, Connecticut, US
- Died: 7 October 1970
- Occupation: Genealogical writer
- Writing career
- Period: 1912–1970
- Genre: Genealogy

Donald Lines Jacobus (3 October 1887 – 7 October 1970) was an American genealogist and historian. He was a Fellow of The American Society of Genealogists and the founder of The American Genealogist (TAG).

== Early life and education ==
Jacobus was born on 3 October 1887 in New Haven, Connecticut, the only child of John Ira Jacobus (1855–1912), a banker, and Ida Wilmot Lines (1855–1952), daughter of Henry Lines. The Jacobus family's lineage can be traced back to Dutch origins, recorded in Albany, New York, in 1683.

He received his education at Yale University, earning a Bachelor of Arts degree in 1908, followed by a Master of Arts degree in 1911.

== Career ==
Jacobus began working on his genealogical compendium Families of Ancient New Haven in 1912, and it was published in eight volumes between 1922 and 1932. This compendium was published as a part of The American Genealogist journal (originally called New Haven Genealogical Magazine), which Jacobus established in 1922. He served as editor and publisher of the journal until 1937.

His other published works include:

- Genealogy as Pastime and Profession, 1930
- History and Genealogy of the Families of Old Fairfield, a three-volume work sponsored by the local Daughters of the American Revolution chapter in Fairfield, Connecticut, 1930–1932.
- A History of the Seymour Family: Descendants of Richard Seymour of Hartford, Connecticut, for Six Generations; With Extensive Amplification of the Lines Deriving from His Son John Seymour of Hartford

Jacobus was a Fellow of The American Society of Genealogists. Following his death, his colleague Milton Rubincam described him as "the man who more than any other single individual elevated genealogy to the high degree of scholarship it now occupies."

=== Eponymous award ===
In 1972, the American Society of Genealogists established The Donald Lines Jacobus Award "to encourage sound scholarship in genealogical writing".

== Awards ==
Jacobus was the first genealogist to be included in the National Genealogy Hall of Fame by the National Genealogical Society.

== Personal life ==
Jacobus never married. He enjoyed tracing the descendants of Spain's King Ferdinand and Queen Isabella.

He died at the Golden Manor Nursing Home in New Haven, Connecticut, on 7 October 1970 following an extended period of illness.
