= The Genealogist =

- Available in: English
- Owner: American Society of Genealogists
- Editors: Charles M. Hansen; Gale Ion Harris
- Website: fasg.org/the-genealogist
- Launched: 1980; 46 years ago

The Genealogist is a bi-annual genealogical journal founded in 1980 by Neil D. Thompson, a fellow of the American Society of Genealogists (ASG). Articles are published in full detail, including references. The journal allows shorter articles, but focuses on articles that are often too large or complex for other genealogical publishing forums. Each issue has a minimum of 128 pages.

== Goals ==
The primary goals of the periodical are the same as the ASG:

- "To advance genealogical research standards and to encourage publication of the results"
- "To secure recognition of genealogy as a serious subject of research in the historical and social fields of learning"

== Editors ==
The Genealogist is currently edited by Charles M. Hansen, Colonel, US Army retired, FASG and Gale Ion Harris, Ph.D., FASG.

== Publication ==
From 1997 (vol. 11) to 2009 (vol. 23), the journal was published by Picton Press. Since Vol. 24, No. 1 (Spring 2010), it has been published and distributed directly by the American Society of Genealogists.
