= Cluster genealogy =

Genealogical research technique

Cluster genealogy is a research technique employed by genealogists to learn more about an ancestor by examining records left by their cluster. A cluster consists of extended family, friends, neighbors, and other associates such as business partners. Investigating the lives of people connected to an ancestor offers a deeper and more precise insight into the ancestor's own life at the time and place.

== Background ==
Genealogical research begins with a question of identity, relationship, event, or situation. To answer the question, a genealogist gathers and analyzes data from source documents and formulates an answer to the question based on the resulting evidence.

The basic method of research is to gather data from records left by the target ancestor and his or her immediate family. There are several situations, however, where a genealogist wants or needs to use alternate research methods. One such method is cluster genealogy, in which the records left by members of the ancestor's cluster are examined for evidence with which to resolve the question at hand.

== Purpose ==
Cluster genealogy is most often used for the following reasons.

- To break through a "brick wall". In genealogy, a brick wall is a question for which a genealogist has not been able to formulate a satisfactory answer based on the evidence thus far collected. Using cluster genealogy, additional evidence is sought in data gathered from the records left by persons in the ancestor's cluster. For example, if the question is one of place of birth, researching the origins of the ancestor's neighbors can be helpful. Unrelated family groups often migrated together or followed earlier migrations of neighbors or family members.
- To build a genealogical proof. When constructing a genealogical proof, it is not sufficient to simply accumulate an assortment of evidence that supports a conclusion. To meet the Genealogical Proof Standard, a genealogist must "conduct reasonably exhaustive research involving all information that is or may be pertinent to the identity, relationship, event, or situation in question." (Emphasis added.) It follows that a reasonably exhaustive research will often include a search of records created by persons in the target ancestor's cluster.
- To develop context for an ancestor's life. The facts of an ancestor's life are often meaningful only in the context of his cluster. For example, the fact that an ancestor was a Catholic is interesting; the fact that the ancestor and his family were the only Catholics in their community is intriguing.

== See also ==
- One-place study
