= Frazin =

Frazin is a surname. Notable people with the surname include:

- Gladys Frazin (1900–1939), American actress
- Howard Frazin (born 1962), American composer
- Judith R. Frazin (born 1942), American genealogist
