= Frederick Lewis Weis =

American genealogist

The Reverend Frederick Lewis Weis
- Born: August 22, 1895; Cranston, Rhode Island, U.S.
- Died: April 11, 1966 (aged 70); Brattleboro, Vermont, U.S.
- Occupation: Genealogist
- Notable work: Ancestral Roots of Sixty Colonists Who Came to New England between 1623 and 1650

Rev. Frederick Lewis Weis, Th.D. (August 22, 1895 – April 11, 1966) was an American historian and the writer of a number of well-known genealogical books.

Born in Cranston, Rhode Island to John Peter Carl Weis and his wife Georgina Lewis, both natives of Massachusetts, Frederick was the second child of four children.

In April 1913, he entered the United States Naval Academy, graduating in March 1917. He served on the Wisconsin and North Dakota and retired prematurely due to illness. He was active in various genealogical organizations and wrote numerous books and articles. He is today still remembered as a foundational writer in many areas of genealogical research.

He was elected a Fellow of the American Society of Genealogists in 1951.

He died at Brattleboro, Vermont.

== Selected works ==
- Magna Charta Sureties, 1215, Baltimore, 1964
- Ancestral Roots of Sixty Colonists Who Came to New England between 1623 and 1650, 1951
- Colonial Clergy of Maryland Delaware and Georgia
- Colonial Clergy of the Middle Colonies: New York New Jersey and Pennsylvania 1628 1776
- Colonial Clergy of Virginia, North Carolina and South Carolina, 1995
- The Colby Family in Early America, Caledonia, The Colonial Press, 1970
- Eight lines of descent of John Prescott, founder of Lancaster, Massachusetts, 1645, from Alfred the Great, King of England, 871-901
