= Brocton =

Brocton may refer to:

== Places ==
United Kingdom

- Brocton, Cornwall
- Brocton, Staffordshire

United States

- Brocton, Illinois
- Brocton, New York

== Other ==
- Brocton F.C., in Brocton, Staffordshire

== See also ==
- Brockton (disambiguation)
