= Gore Roll =

Earliest American roll of arms

Gore Roll Armorial
- New England Historic Genealogical Society
- Type: Armorial
- Date: 1750s
- Place of origin: Boston, Massachusetts, Colonial America
- Language: English
- Author: John Gore
- Material: Parchment and paper
- Script: Littera cursiva
- Contents: Two series: 1. 84 coats of arms in full color 2. 15 coats of arms in black and white
- Illumination: 84 hand-colored coats of arms

The Gore Roll of Arms is the earliest American roll of arms. Created by Boston coach painter and heraldist John Gore chiefly in the 1750s, the Gore Roll contains 99 coats of arms of colonial Americans, many of whom are considered Boston Brahmin. Many of the arms might have been sourced by Gore from the Promptuarium Armorum while some of the English coats may have been sourced from the Chute Pedigree. The roll is held in the Harold Bowditch Collection of the New England Historic Genealogical Society in Boston, Massachusetts.

== Contents ==
The emblazonments of the arms begin on the third page and continue for the next twenty-five pages. Of the 99 coats included in the Gore Roll are the arms of early notable Americans like Anna Richards née Winthrop, Isaac Addington, Samuel White, John Legg, and William Hutchinson.

The roll is divided into two sections:

- 84 coats of arms in full color
- 15 coats of arms in black and white

Most pages have four coats per page, while the final page has only three.
