= Judith R. Frazin =

American historian

Judith R. Frazin (born August 30, 1942 in Chicago, Illinois) has been a genealogist for more than 39 years, and is the author of three editions of A Translation Guide to 19th-Century Polish-Language Civil-Registration Documents.

Frazin has been affiliated with genealogical societies (sometimes known as a family history society). She served as president of the Jewish Genealogical Society of Illinois for ten years. She was program chairperson for the 1984 national seminar on Jewish genealogy, and served as a member-at-large on the board of the International Association of Jewish Genealogical Societies (IAJGS) for three years. In July 2010, the IAJGS conferred on Frazin its annual award for "Outstanding Contribution to Jewish Genealogy via the Internet, Print or Electronic Product."

The Polish Genealogical Society of America recognized Frazin for her contribution to the field of genealogy by selecting her to receive its Wigilia award for the year 2000. Frazin is also an experienced lecturer and researcher, and penned a genealogical column for the newspaper The Jewish Post and Opinion. .
