= Rootschat =

RootsChat is a free online genealogy forum for researching family history through collaboration. The countries include research in United Kingdom, Ireland, Australia, New Zealand, Canada, USA and South Africa. It was launched by Trystan Davies and Sarah Davies on 31 December 2003. 18 months after its launch its membership was 16,000 and it was gaining 140 new members per day. Members ask questions and exchange information using a number of online forums.

== Membership ==
As of April 2014 there are now over 200,000 members with over 4.5 million postings covering over 588,000 topics. RootsChat uses volunteer forum moderators in an effort to keep a friendly atmosphere and welcome new visitors.

Members have created various games combining the resources available to them, and their passion for genealogy. These include Censuswhacking, whereby people look through the English census indexes for a unique first name, surname or occupation; and a monthly challenge with an aim of discovering as much as possible about a randomly selected person.

At irregular intervals "Meets" are organised, where RootsChat members can meet and get to know each other face to face.

== Website Organisation ==
The message posting area of the site is organised into various boards, some grouped together. As well as generic beginner and "common room" boards, countries and British and Irish Counties all have their own boards to allow people researching in the same areas to communicate and share knowledge. There is a strong ethos of sharing resources, with members frequently looking up census and parish records for each other.

In addition to these boards there are special Cornish, Irish, Gaelic and Welsh boards for postings in each respective language.

There are also several very active "Special Interest" boards, including

- Photograph Restoration & Dating board to help date and restore damaged family pictures
- Handwriting Deciphering & Recognition Reading and understanding of old handwriting
- Technical Help board providing assistance with hardware and family-history software
- Armed Forces WW1 and WW2
- Occupation Interest for people interested in the history of a particular occupation
- Travelling People for topics about Ancestors who travelled around the Country including Romanies, gypsies and Circus Travellers.
- One Name Studies Research and discussion of one single surname.
- Heraldry Crests and Coats of Arms Questions on Coats of Arms Answered
- Ancestral Family Tree DNA Testing how to interpret DNA Test results

Friendship bonds created between members have led to the creation of two boards, the "Lighter Side" and "Totally Off Topic" available to members only, and a chatroom for humorous and postings unrelated to family history

== RootsChat in the News ==
In a case reported by the BBC the members of the site were successful in closing a police enquiry dating back over fifty years. In another, through the help of RootsChatters, the relatives of airmen killed in a crash in 1942 were traced and were able to attend the funeral ceremony for the lost airmen.

In 2014 the BBC reported about a Tennessee woman who found her half-brother in Birmingham, England, after help from Rootschat members.
