= A Translation Guide to 19th-Century Polish-Language Civil-Registration Documents =

- Front cover of A Translation Guide to 19th-Century Polish-Language Civil-Registration Documents 3rd edition
- Author: Judith R. Frazin
- Language: English
- Subject: Poland
- Genre: Genealogy
- Publisher: Jewish Genealogical Society of Illinois
- Publication date: 2009 (third edition)
- Publication place: United States
- Media type: Print (hardcover, wirebound)
- Pages: 472
- ISBN: 978-0-9613512-2-9

A Translation Guide to 19th-Century Polish-Language Civil-Registration Documents (including Birth, Marriage and Death Records) is a book written by genealogical researcher Judith R. Frazin as a tool to help researchers unlock the meaning of 19th-century Polish language civil records. Many researchers use such tools, including this guide, to help decipher records found in genealogical resources, such as the LDS Church's Family History Library.

The book includes: A step-by-step guide, which teaches researchers how to divide each document into a series of "mini-documents" so as to make easier the task of understanding what each document says; 7 sample documents with important words and the information which follows these words highlighted; and 15 topical vocabulary lists, such as Age, Family and Occupations, which are composed of words that actually occur in 19th-century documents.

The first edition of the book (1984) was significantly revised in its second edition (1989), which expanded upon the various topical lists and added a listing of numerous given names as found in the relevant records.

The Jewish Genealogical Society of Illinois, publisher of the book, released a third, revised edition in 2009. Set in larger type, it further expands the topical lists, includes a map, and provides information about census records and how the Polish language works (including an explanation of case endings and name suffixes). The third edition also includes tips on how to locate one's ancestral town and records from that town.

Due to her work on the book, the Polish Genealogical Society of America (PGSA) recognized Judith Frazin's contribution to the field of genealogy by selecting her to receive its Wigilia award in 2000. The PGSA's Wigilia Award honors individuals or organizations that have made a significant contribution to Polish-American Genealogy. An earlier recipient of the award was the Church of Jesus Christ of Latter-day Saints (LDS Church) for its "efforts to microfilm eastern European records in areas that once belonged to the Polish Commonwealth."

In July 2010, The International Association of Jewish Genealogical Societies (IAJGS) conferred on her its annual award for "Outstanding Contribution to Jewish Genealogy via the Internet, Print or Electronic Product."

== Reviews ==
- Pathways and Passages; Winter 1989 issue (Vol. 6, No.1); published by the Polish Genealogical Society of Connecticut and the Northeast, Inc.
- Gen Dorbry! (Volume IV, No 11, 30 November 2003)
- Wandering Volhynians Newsletter, Vol 3-1, March 1990 (see also Mar 96); Wandering Volhynians Newsletter was a quarterly publication serving the genealogical, historical and heritage interests of descendants of Germans who migrated to or through Congress Poland and Volhynia. Ceased publication in 1999.
