= One-place study =

One-place studies are a branch of family history and/or local history with a focus on the entire population of a single road, village or community, not just a single, geographically dispersed family line.

== Introduction ==
In the course of a one-place study, a prime objective is to transcribe the registers of christenings, marriages and burials of the parish church so they can be restructured into family order in a database. This is then correlated with other archival records such as tax, land and testamentary documents, and published as a biographical index. When such a study is done scientifically as a precursor to academic analysis, it is known as family reconstitution.

The term one-place study is sometimes also used for a microhistory of a single urban street and its residents, including the changes in land ownership, agricultural or commercial activities.

Unlike a local history, which focuses on the past as described by residents, a one-place study can provide a statistical approach that reveals hidden relationships, particularly in homogeneous village communities where almost the entire population has inter-married over the centuries, and may even disprove local legends.

== Development ==
The world's first major one-place study is believed to have been an attempt started in Austria in 1920 by Konrad Brandner to chart a complete genealogy of the population of the Steiermark region.

After the Nazi takeover of Germany, the Nazi farming authority Reichsnährstand began a nationwide campaign in 1937 to document the "Aryan blood" of countryfolk by documenting the ancestry of every village in a Dorfsippenbuch. 30 such books were published by 1940. Nazi schoolteachers led the copying of parish registers onto index cards, and boasted that 30,000 Heimat histories would be written, but the Second World War brought this project to a halt.

Though genealogy in Germany was to take decades to shake off this evil association, some enthusiasts resumed work on the card indexes or typewritten lists left from before the war, and the first new one-place study, now renamed an Ortssippenbuch, appeared in 1956. Later the term was changed yet again, to de:Ortsfamilienbuch. More than 3,000 have appeared, with a trend away from print to electronic publication.

== Family reconstitution ==
Untainted by Nazi associations, a French demographer, Louis Henry (1911–1991), was developing methods in France to survey historic populations. His 1956 book co-written with Michel Fleury, Des registres paroissiaux à l'histoire de la population. Manuel de dépouillement et d'exploitation de l'état civil ancien, explained how to start a one-place study.

By 1959 he was proposing to reconstitute the population of France from 1670 to 1829. As a founder of Historical demography, Henry devised methods that went well beyond mere extraction, and he developed elaborate rules to correct bias and indicate which family histories could be used for different kinds of statistical analysis.

In England, family reconstitution methods were adopted and developed by the Cambridge Group for the History of Population and Social Structure established in 1964. Amateur one-place studies followed in the 1980s as an outgrowth of indexing projects under the leadership of John Dowding and Colin Mills and achieved regional scale with the Devon Online Parish Clerks and One-Place Studies project.

The fact that seven censuses from 1841 to 1901 provide a household-by-household record of the entire population may have reduced the perceived need in Britain for one-place studies compared to the interest they have generated in Germany and France. Many English studies therefore concentrate on the period before 1837, the year when open-access, national indexes of births, marriages and deaths in England and Wales began.

== Methods ==
One-place studies exploit manuscript ecclesiastical and civil records to explore the microhistory of the villagers and their lives. In Europe, such records usually date back to about 1600 and include:

- Church records of christenings, marriages and burials
- Voter or citizenship rolls
- Records of wills and deceased estates
- Land tenure records
- Tax lists
- Muster lists for militia service

The internet has stimulated amateur one-place studies, especially in England, since websites allow large volumes of historic material to be published easily. One-place studies of urban parishes are less common, since urban populations were migratory and analysis is more difficult when few of the families remain present for the whole period under study.

== Motivation ==
While one-place studies in Britain are often pursued for simple enjoyment, amateur one-place studies in continental nations sometimes assert their value to social science. The introduction to a recent survey of German one-place studies listed the following topics that were likely to benefit from the research:

- Genetic pathology involving incest
- Economics of peasant families
- Varying rules of legal inheritance
- Village ecology
- Class basis of family sizes
- Migration
- Urbanization
- Age at marriage
- Social mobility
- Household structure
- Sociology of the family
- Microhistory
- Catholic-Protestant comparisons
- Sociobiology

== See also ==
- Local history book
- Cluster genealogy
