= Residential Genealogy =

Residential genealogy refers to the study of the historical connections between individuals and their places of residence or ownership. This interdisciplinary field involves researching historical documents, land records, and other materials to discover the changing occupants or owners of a particular dwelling or piece of land over time. Residential genealogy is intriguing to a diverse array of individuals, including history enthusiasts, genealogists, and real estate agents.

== Types ==
Residential genealogy has two main facets:

- Property genealogy involves researching the genealogy of a specific home, building, or land over time. The objective is not necessarily to identify all individuals who have lived in a place but rather to determine its successive owners. This vertical historical search into the past can reveal fascinating insights into a property's history. It's not necessarily a "who slept here" endeavor but a "who owned this" question.
- Ancestral property search is a more personal dimension of residential genealogy involves tracing where one's ancestors lived and owned property. Being a landed gentry has been a societal aspiration for many throughout history. This aspect involves linking family names and places to discover the property once owned by one's ancestors.

== Practice ==
The practice of residential genealogy can provide a rich understanding of the past, offering insights into the evolution of neighborhoods and towns over time. It allows individuals to understand the historical context of their homes, from those residing in historic properties curious about their home's previous owners, to those living in newer homes interested in how their neighborhoods developed over time. The field also provides insights into broader historical shifts, such as the rise and fall of ghost towns, or what previously existed on the land now occupied by modern structures like reservoirs or cemeteries.

This form of research often necessitates a collection of 19th and early 20th-century maps, including American city, town, and county maps. Detailed cadastral maps, in particular, are instrumental in showing every building and street of a particular era. These maps frequently include the names of the residents of single-family homes, while larger buildings like apartment complexes bear the property owner's name. Additional resources such as antique city directories, census records, and phone books can greatly aid researchers in retracing both the history of any location and its inhabitants.

In the digital age, locating a specific historical building or residence has become relatively straightforward, thanks to the integration of historical map collections with modern mapping technology. Users can trace the development of structures and neighborhoods over time—sometimes spanning as much as 250 years—by merely entering an address. These digital historical maps, much like their modern counterparts, offer intricate and comprehensive views of nearly all structures of their era.
