= Bloodlines of Salem =

American family history group

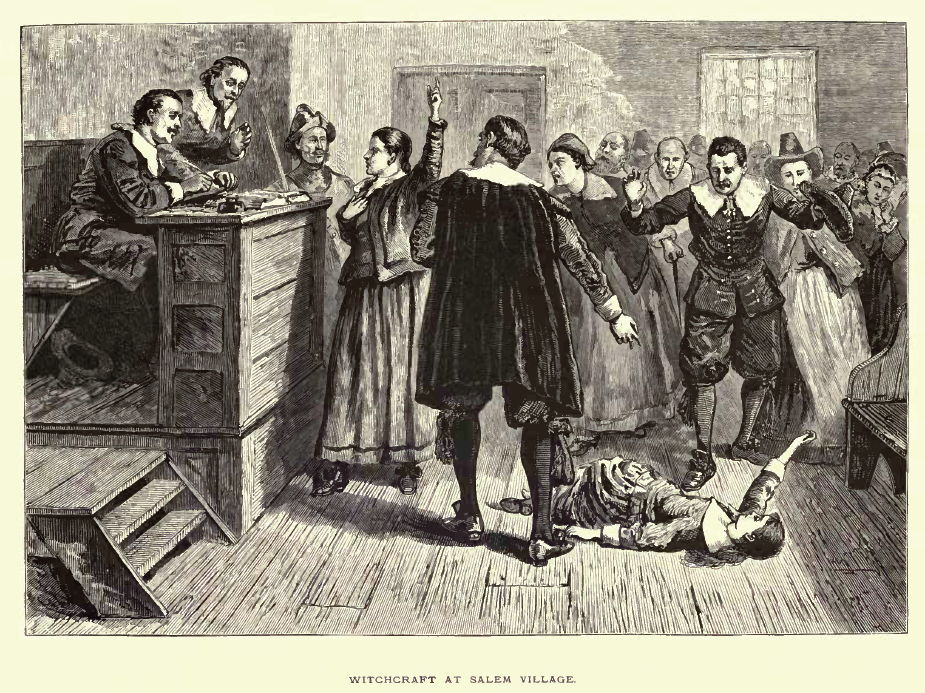
"Witchcraft at Salem Village" likely by F.O.C. Darley, Granville Perkins or William Ludwell Sheppard, ill. Published in "Pioneers in the settlement of America: From Florida in 1510 to California in 1849," by William August Crafts, Vol. 1, p. 453, Boston: Samuel Walker and Co. 1876.

Bloodlines of Salem was a Salt Lake City-based family-history group in the United States. Its purpose was described as providing a "place where visitors share ideas and information about the Salem witch trials of 1692, its participants and their families. Many visitors have researched and proved their descents from one or more of the participants. The trials unfolded more than three centuries ago and continue to figure prominently in the studies of history, law and religion. As amateur and professional researchers, or 'Salemologists,' however, their study of the trials isn't limited to their lineages."

== Membership ==
A person was eligible to register a membership with the group if he or she proposed in writing 1) a desire to register, 2) an agreement with the group promise to "remember the Salem Witch Trials and its participants by associating their families and preserving their lineages", "share commercial, genealogical and historical information about the trials and its participants" and "educate others about [the] group and promise" and 3) a name, city of residence and contact information. The person was not charged a registration fee, could use the postnominal abbreviation "MBoS" and could request at any time to cancel or change the registration.

A person was eligible to register a descendant membership with the group if he or she was otherwise eligible to register a membership and proved beyond doubt his or her descent from or relationship to one or more participants of the trials with lineages showing detailed descendancy. The person was not charged a registration fee, could use the postnominal abbreviation "DBoS" and could request at any time to cancel or change the registration, and must have included proof of parentage for each generation, beginning with his or her own, so that the person named first in a generation was a child or relative of the couple named in the following generation.

== History ==
The group was founded in 2007 in Salt Lake City, home of the worldwide Family History Library, to encourage and provide resources to persons who are or suspect they are descendants and relatives of trials participants, or enjoy an interest in the trials. The head of BLoS, as of October 2013, was Steven Hale.

== Activities ==
Group researchers investigated and published evidence of notable descendants and relatives of trials participants. Its 2007 investigation discovered that "Harry Potter" film actor Tom Felton is a relative of several participants including Lt. Nathaniel Felton and John Proctor, who was hanged during the trials.

Their website had a section of "notable descendants of the accused and the accusers" which included Walt Disney, Princess Diana, and Ray Bradbury.

== Legacy ==
The organization went out of existence in 2018.

== See also ==
- List of people of the Salem witch trials
- Salem witch trials
- Timeline of the Salem witch trials
