= Brocton, Cornwall =

Hamlet in Cornwall, England

Coordinates: 50.48405°N 4.80354°W

Brocton is a hamlet in the parish of St Breock, Cornwall, England, UK.
