= Genealogical Proof Standard =

The Genealogical Proof Standard (GPS) is a guideline for establishing the reliability ("proof") of a genealogical conclusion with reasonable certainty. It is important within the genealogical community for clearly communicating the quality of research performed, such as by a professional genealogist. It is also useful for helping new genealogists understand what is needed to do high-quality research, how to identify an individual and establish family relationships.

It has five elements:

- reasonably exhaustive research;
- complete and accurate source citations;
- analysis and correlation of the collected information;
- resolution of any conflicting evidence; and
- a soundly reasoned, coherently written conclusion.
