= Brockton =

Brockton may refer to:

== Canada ==
- Brockton (electoral district), Canada
- Brockton, Ontario, Canada
- Brockton Point, a point and attached peninsula in Vancouver
- Brockton Point Lighthouse, in Stanley Park, Vancouver, British Columbia
- Brockton Village, a neighbourhood within the City of Toronto, Canada

== U.S. ==
- Brockton, Georgia
- Brockton, Massachusetts
  - Brockton station (MBTA), a train station in Brockton, Massachusetts
- Brockton, Montana
- Brockton, Pennsylvania

== Other ==
- Brockton, Shropshire, England
- Brockton Station (Antarctica)

== See also ==
- Brocton (disambiguation)
