= New England Historic Genealogical Society =

Oldest and largest genealogical society in the United States, founded in 1845

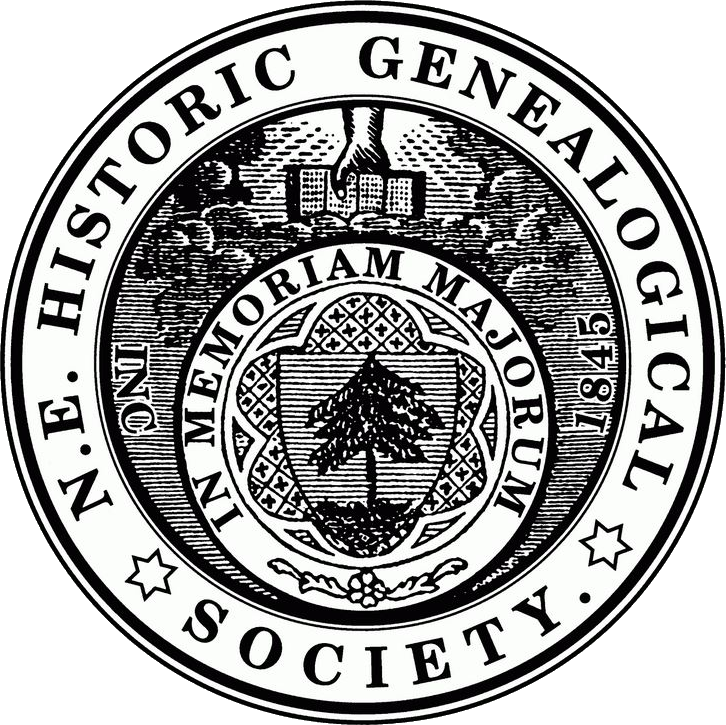
- Founded: Boston, Massachusetts, U.S. (1845, as the New England Historic-Genealogical Society)
- Founders: Charles Ewer (1790–1853); Lemuel Shattuck (1793–1859); Samuel Gardner Drake (1798–1875); William Henry Montague (1804–1889); John Wingate Thornton (1818–1878)
- Type: Genealogical society
- Purpose: Family history, Genealogy, Kinship and descent
- Location: Boston, Massachusetts, US
- Coordinates: 42.3518°N 71.0753°W
- Region served: United States
- Services: Genealogical records Historical records Genealogy research Genealogy education
- President and CEO: Ryan J. Woods
- Board of directors: Thomas B. Hagen; Helen E.R. Sayles; Brady Brim-DeForest; Mark T. Cox IV
- Website: americanancestors.org

The New England Historic Genealogical Society (NEHGS) is the oldest and largest genealogical society in the United States, founded in 1845.

NEHGS provides family history services through its staff, scholarship, website, educational opportunities, and research center. Today it has over 250,000 members and more than 90 staff and volunteers.

== Headquarters ==
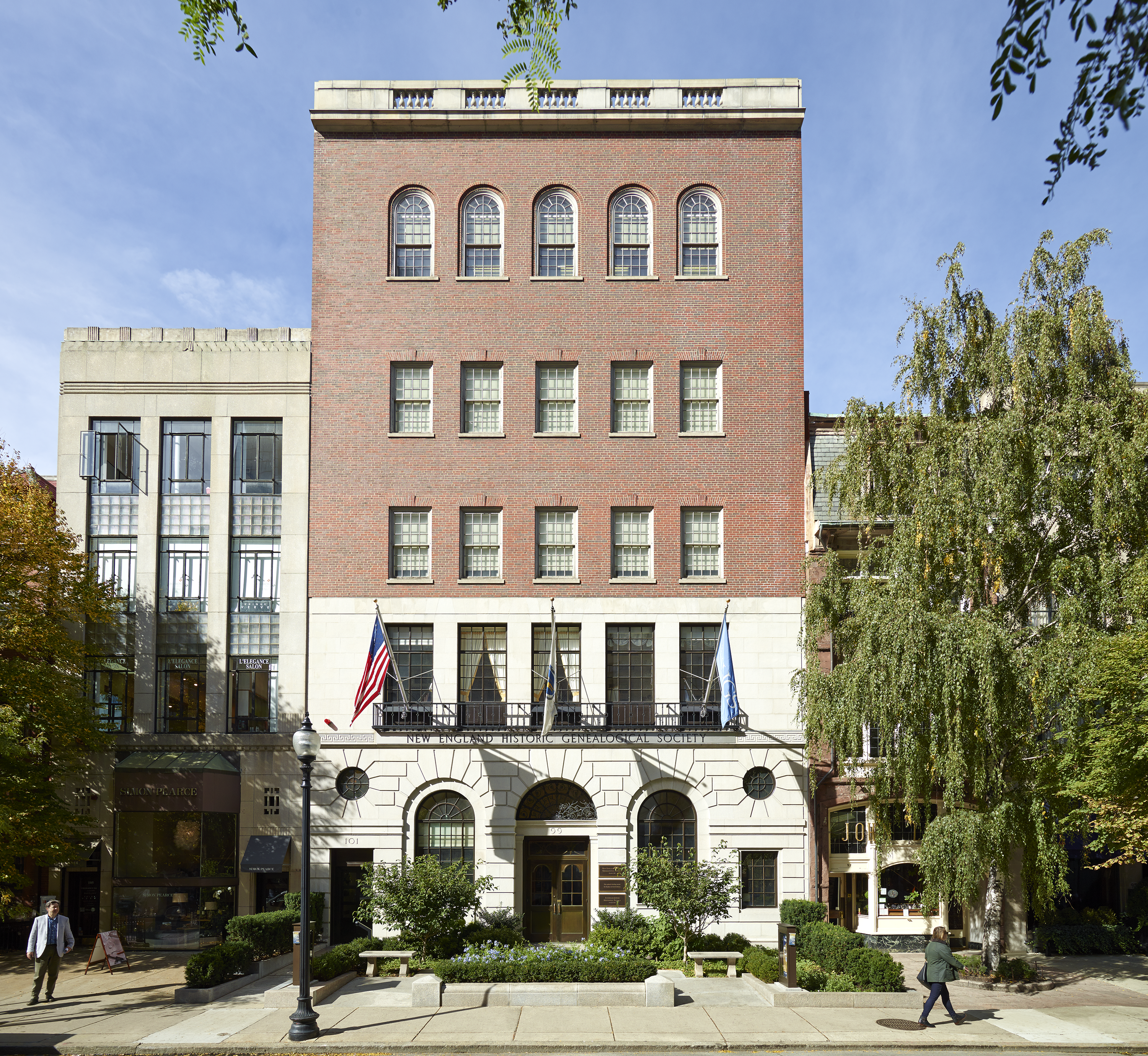
New England Historic Genealogical Society headquarters at 99-101 Newbury Street, Boston, Massachusetts.

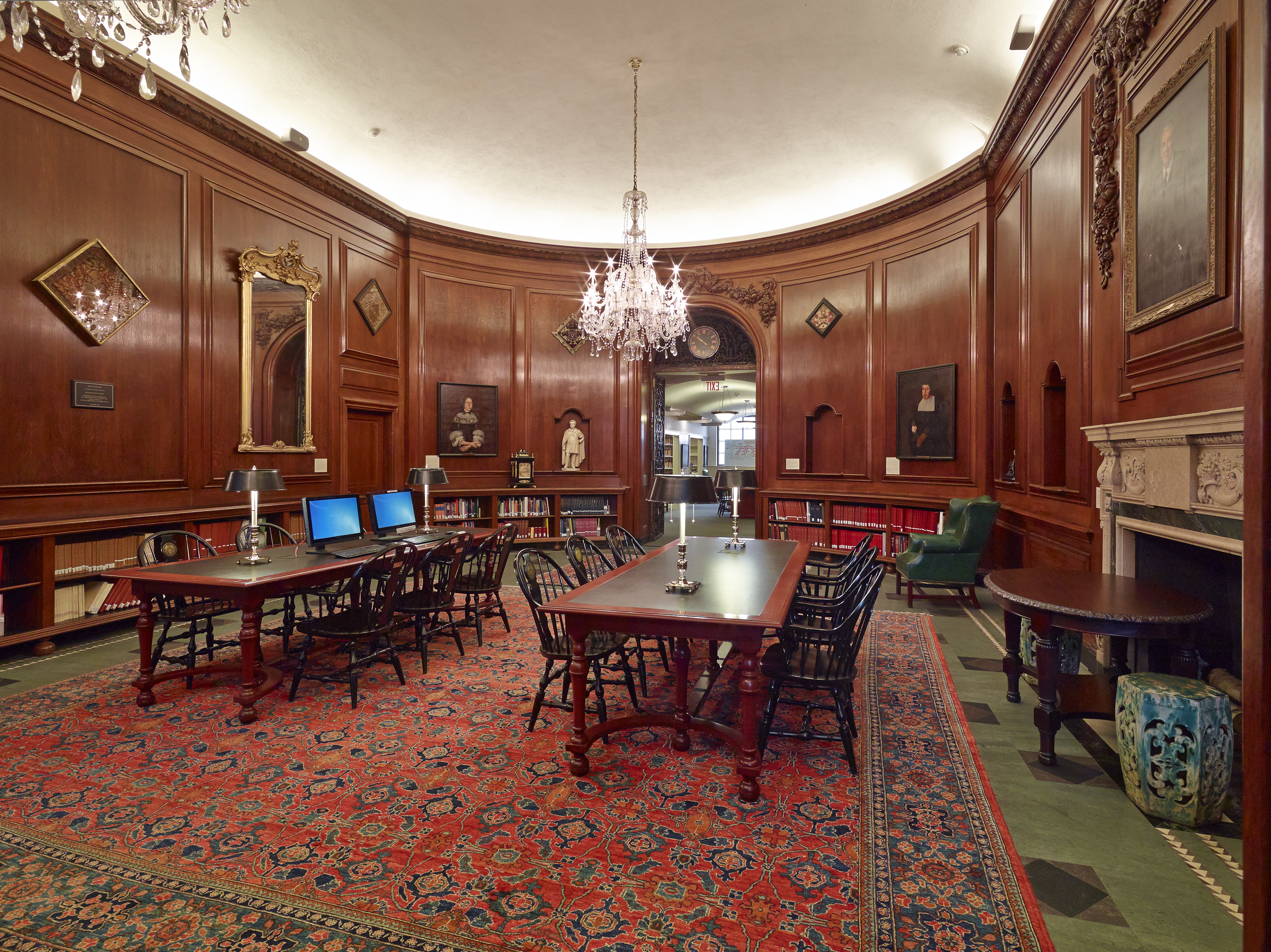
First-floor Treat Rotunda at NEHGS.

NEHGS is headquartered at 99–101 Newbury Street in Boston's Back Bay neighborhood. NEHGS moved there in 1964 and it is the seventh location for the organization.

The first three floors of NEHGS' present location were built as the headquarters of The New England Trust Company in 1928, designed by Ralph Coolidge Henry and Henry P. Richmond, successors to noted American architect Guy Lowell. Henry and Richmond also designed buildings at Colby College, Pine Manor, and Phillips Academy in Andover, Massachusetts. When NEHGS moved into its new headquarters in 1964, it added five floors on top of the New England Trust Company building.

Ruth Chauncey Bishop Reading Room at NEHGS.

Prior headquarters included the City Building, Court Square, Room 9 during the years 1846 and 1847; the Massachusetts Block, Court Square for 1847 to 1851; 5 Tremont Street, 3rd floor for 1851 through 1858; 17 Bromfield Street, 3rd floor from 1858 to 1871; 18 Somerset Street – 1871 to 1913; 9 Ashburton Place from 1913 to 1964.

George Washington "porthole" portrait painted by Rembrandt Peale, 1853.

== Resources ==
=== The Brim-DeForest Library ===
The Brim-DeForest library, named for philanthropist and heraldist Brady Brim-DeForest, is a research library holding materials related to genealogical research in the United States, as well as materials relevant to the United Kingdom, Ireland, and Canada. The collection include 200,000 bound volumes; 5,000+ linear feet of original manuscripts; and 100,000 rolls of microfilm. Manuscripts in the Brim-DeForest library collection include The Gore Roll, the earliest American armorial in existence. NEHGS also holds a fine arts collection including works on canvas or paper by Joseph Badger, John Singleton Copley, Pierre Charles L'Enfant, Jonathan Mason, Jr., Rembandt Peale, and John Ritto Penniman. Items from its collection of American furniture were featured in Antiques and the Arts Weekly Magazine. In March 2008, NEHGS received a gift of the earliest known photograph of Helen Keller with her teacher Anne Sullivan. The photo, taken in July 1888, shows 8-year old Keller holding a doll. The photograph was subsequently given to the Brewster Historical Society in Brewster, Massachusetts.

=== Website ===
The NEHGS website, www.AmericanAncestors.org, is ranked number 120 in the Genealogy and Ancestry category on SimilarWeb. More than 15,000 members research on the website every day and an additional 15,000 non-members visit daily. It features a catalog and nearly 3,000 unique searchable databases containing information on over 113 million people. Popular databases are Massachusetts Vital Records to 1850, Massachusetts Vital Records 1841-1915, Massachusetts Vital Records 1911-1915, The New England Historical and Genealogical Register, The American Genealogist, Social Security Death Index, Cemetery Transcriptions, Great Migration Begins: 1620-1633, and Abstracts of Wills in New York State 1787-1835.

The Society's website has online exhibits featuring items from the Society's manuscript collection.

In addition to the main website, NEHGS supports www.GreatMigration.org.

NEHGS launched its first website, www.NEHGS.org in 1996; it was one of the first non-profit genealogical societies to have an online presence. NEHGS' first website consisted of 38 pages with information about NEHGS services and programs. In 1999, with the introduction of a new magazine New England Ancestors, NEHGS changed its URL to www.NewEnglandAncestors.org, adding genealogical articles to the website for use by members and the public. In 2001, NEHGS redesigned its website to include data rich content, new articles, and member forums.

=== Education ===
NEHGS provides various educational opportunities relating to genealogy and family history. Most of educational programs are led and/or taught by members of the NEHGS staff, though some include invited guests.

NEHGS offers a series of research tours, lectures, seminars, and other events throughout the year. For over thirty years, NEHGS has conducted a week-long tour to the Family History Library in Salt Lake City, Utah and frequently offers opportunities to research and visit in Ireland, Scotland, Washington D.C., England, Quebec, and other places. For more than twenty years, NEHGS has sponsored a week-long summer “Come Home to New England” program in Boston.

The Society has also developed online seminars many of which are taught by their staff genealogists on a wide variety of topics such as Internet searching, beginning genealogical research, organizing, preparing lineage society applications, and others.

== Publications ==
NEHGS publishes books on families, genealogists, and historians, including authoritative guides, source record compilations, compiled genealogies, and family histories. The Newbury Street Press imprint is America's leading publisher of privately sponsored family histories.

Among the Society's recent additions to the genealogical canon are Genealogical Writing in the 21st Century, New Englanders in the 1600s, A Guide to Massachusetts Cemeteries, Ancestors of American Presidents: 2009 edition, The Descendants of Henry Sewall, and Twenty Families of Color in Massachusetts.

=== The New England Historical and Genealogical Register ===
Published quarterly since 1847, The New England Historical and Genealogical Register is the flagship journal of American genealogy and the oldest in the field. A wide variety of genealogies and source material have been published in the Register for over 160 years, with an emphasis on New England. Authoritative compiled genealogies have always been a primary focus of the Register. Thousands of New England families have been treated in the pages of the journal, and many more are referred to incidentally. Typically, these articles solve a genealogical problem, identify immigrant origins, or present a full-scale treatment of multiple generations. Henry B. Hoff was appointed editor of the Register in 2001. In October 2009, an annual supplement to the Register, American Ancestors Journal, was introduced.

=== The Great Migration Study Project ===
The Great Migration Study Project is an ongoing scholarly endeavor to create short biographical sketches of all immigrants from Europe to colonial New England between 1620 and 1640 (the Puritan great migration). These number over 5,500 individuals, not including dependent wives and children, almost all of whom came from England (in a few cases after an interlude in the Netherlands). Directed by Robert Charles Anderson, the project is conducted in collaboration with the Society and has been underway since 1988. Over a dozen volumes of sketches have been published so far, covering over two thousand subjects.

== Committee on Heraldry ==
The Committee on Heraldry of the New England Historic Genealogical Society, established in 1864, is the world's oldest non-governmental body primarily concerned with heraldry.
