= American Society of Genealogists =

Nonprofit organization in the United States

The American Society of Genealogists is the scholarly honorary society of the genealogical field. Founded by John Insley Coddington, Arthur Adams, and Meredith B. Colket, Jr., in December 1940, its membership is limited to 50 living Fellows. ASG has published The Genealogist, a scholarly journal of genealogical research, semi-annually since 1980.

In a time when genealogy was frequently viewed as the realm of eccentric dilettantes, the founders of the Society were leaders advocating more rigorous research standards. This included using original sources whenever possible and documenting the source of information. Donald Lines Jacobus, founder of The American Genealogist, noted in 1960 that a new school had developed in American genealogy circles about 1930. That movement, according to the late Milton Rubincam, "wrote accounts of specific families, documented and referenced: they showed by example how problems should be solved, what sources should be used, and how records should be interpreted."

Fellows of the American Society of Genealogists, who bear the postnominal acronym FASG, have written some of the most notable genealogical materials of the last half-century. In particular, current Fellow Robert Charles Anderson is director of The Great Migration Study Project, an effort to catalogue the earliest European immigrants to New England. John Frederick Dorman completed in 2007 the fourth edition of Adventurers of Purse and Person, chronicling the earliest settlers in colonial Virginia.

== Presidents ==
Below are list of presidents from 1940 till date;

1940–58: Arthur Adams
1958–61: Walter Goodwin Davis
1961–64: Milton Rubincam
1964–67: H. Minot Pitman
1967–70: Kenn Stryker-Rodda
1970–73: Walter Lee Sheppard Jr.
1973–76: Virginia Pope Livingston
1976–79: Malcolm H. Stern
1979–82: Mary E. McCollam Harter
1982–85: John Frederick Dorman
1985–86: Noel C. Stevenson
1986–89: Henry B. Hoff
1989–92: Robert Charles Anderson
1992–95: Neil D. Thompson
1995–98: Cameron H. Allen
1998–2001: Elizabeth Shown Mills
2001–04: Roger D. Joslyn
2004–07: Marsha Hoffman Rising
2007–10: David L. Greene
2010–13: Melinde Lutz Byrne
2013–16: William Bart Saxbe Jr.
2016–19: Henry Z Jones, Jr.
2019– : Joseph C. Anderson II
