= The American Genealogist =

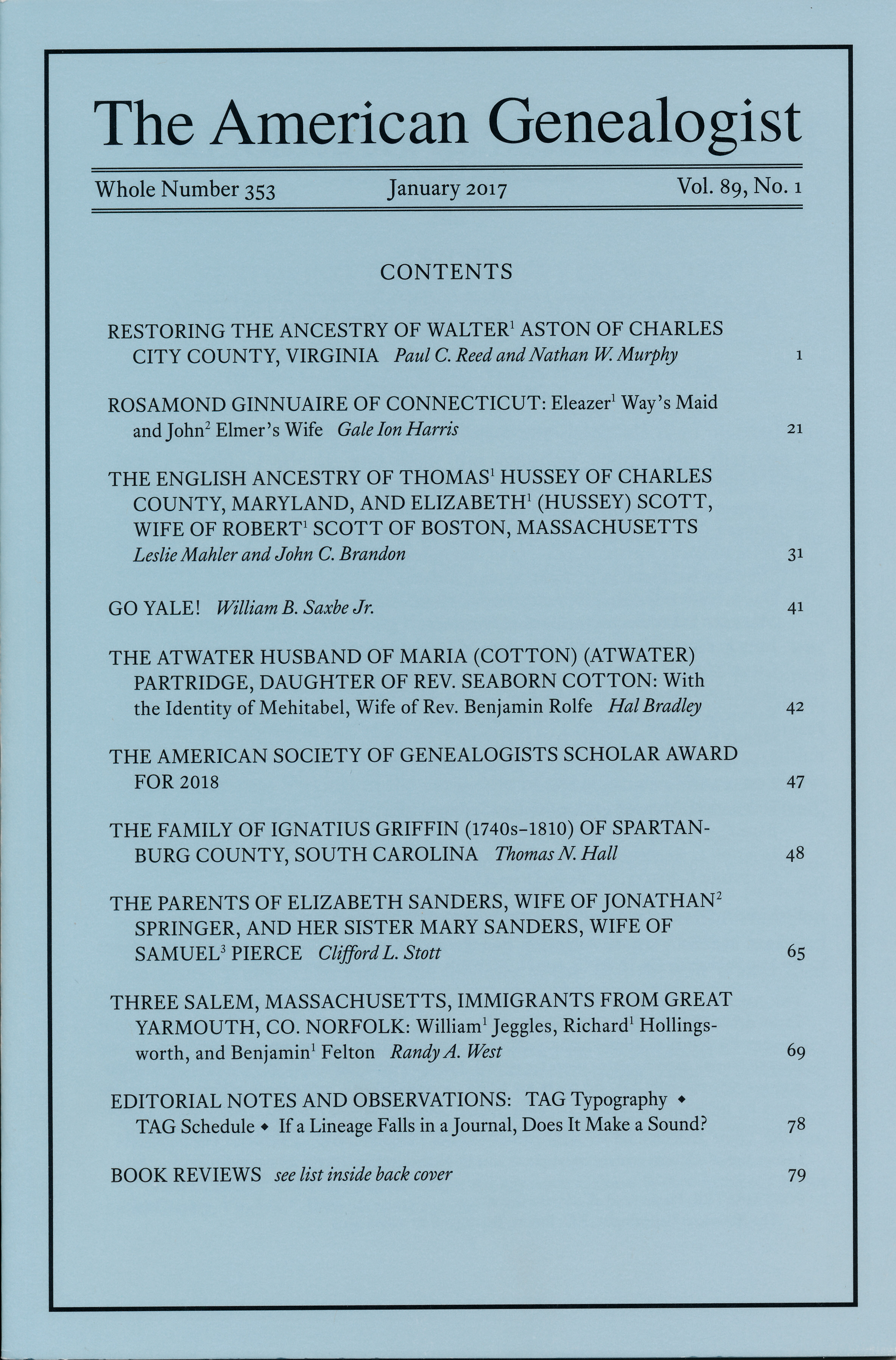
- Discipline: Genealogy, American history
- Language: English
- Edited by: Nathaniel Lane Taylor, Joseph C. Anderson II, Roger D. Joslyn

Publication details
- Former names: New Haven Genealogical Magazine, The American Genealogist and New Haven Genealogical Magazine
- History: 1922–present
- Publisher: The American Genealogist (United States)
- Frequency: Quarterly

Standard abbreviations
- ISO 4: Am. Geneal.

Indexing
- ISSN: 0002-8592
- LCCN: 86643019
- OCLC no.: 15561960

Links
- Journal homepage; Online access

The American Genealogist is a quarterly peer-reviewed academic journal which focuses on genealogy and family history. It was established by Donald Lines Jacobus in 1922 as the New Haven Genealogical Magazine. In July 1932 it was renamed The American Genealogist and New Haven Genealogical Magazine and the last part of the title was dropped in 1937, giving the journal its current title. All editors have been fellows of the American Society of Genealogists.

== Editors-in-chief ==
The following persons have been editors-in-chief:

- Donald Lines Jacobus, 1922–1965
- George E. McCracken, 1966–1983
- Robert Moody Sherman, 1984, and Ruth Wilder Sherman, 1984–1992
- David L. Greene, 1993–2014
- Nathaniel Lane Taylor, 2015–present

== Abstracting and indexing ==
The journal is indexed in the Periodical Source Index and Book Review Index Online Plus.
