= Genealogy =

Study of family lineage and history

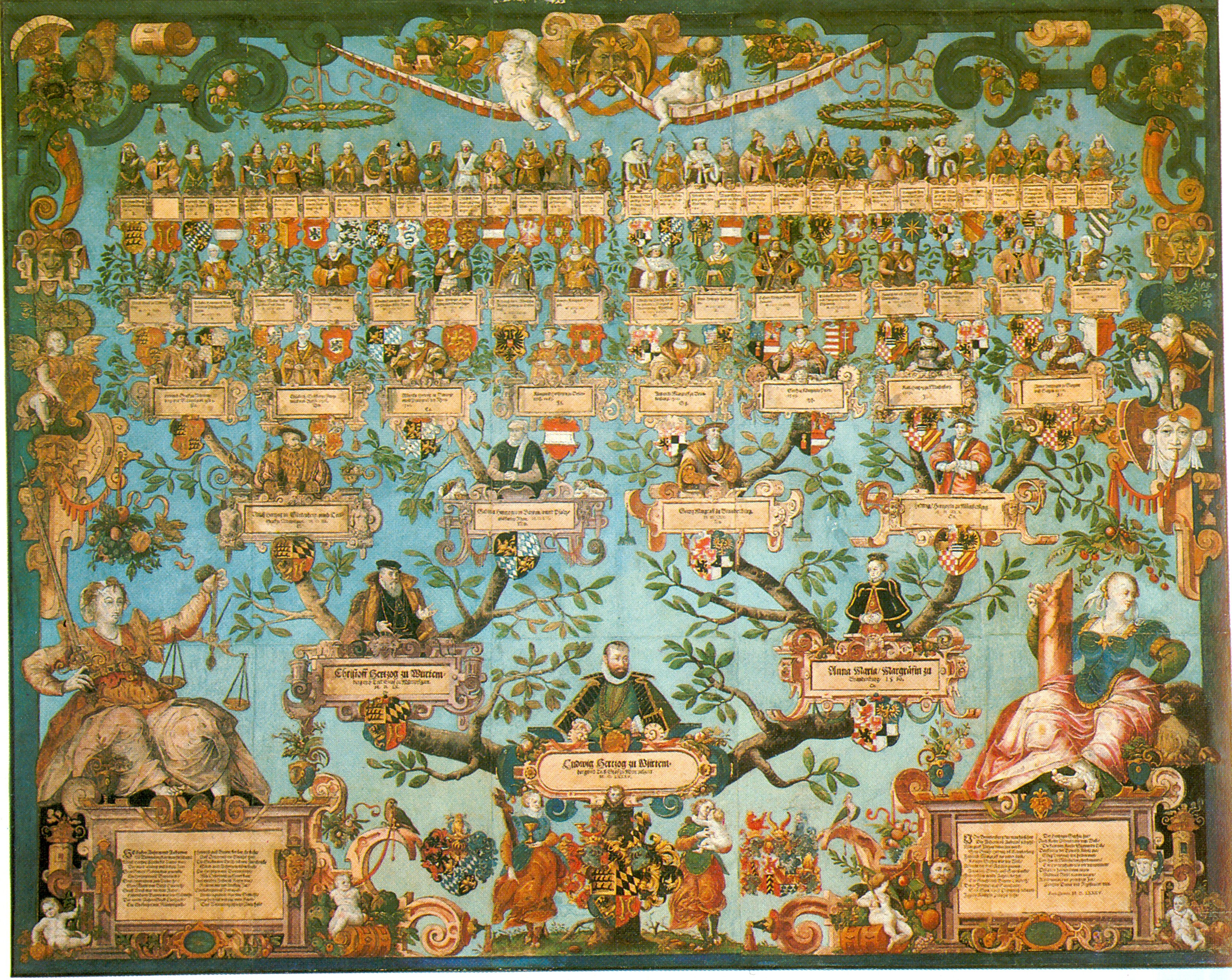
The family tree of Louis III, Duke of Württemberg (ruled 1568–1593)

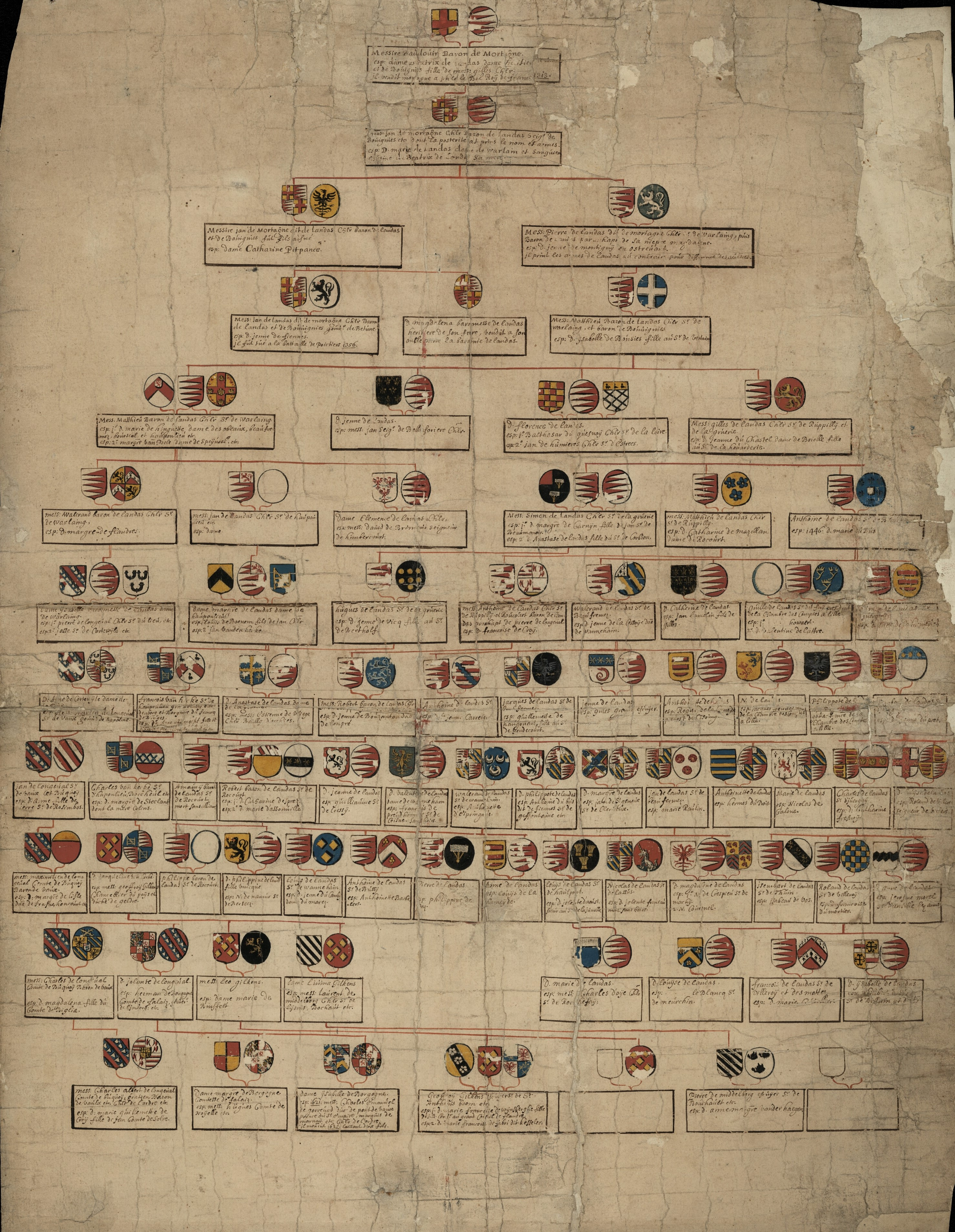
The family tree of "the Landas", a 17th-century family

Genealogy (from Ancient Greek γενεαλογία (genealogía) 'the making of a pedigree') is the study of families, family history, and the tracing of their lineages. Genealogists use oral interviews, historical records, genetic analysis, and other records to obtain information about a family and to demonstrate the kinship and pedigrees of its members. The results are often displayed in charts or written as narratives. The field of family history is broader than genealogy, and covers not just lineage but also family and community history and biography.

The record of genealogical work may be presented as a "genealogy", a "family history", or a "family tree". In the narrow sense, a "genealogy" or a "family tree" traces the descendants of one person, whereas a "family history" traces the ancestors of one person, but the terms are often used interchangeably. A family history may include additional biographical information, family traditions, and the like.

The pursuit of family history and origins tends to be shaped by several motives, including the desire to carve out a place for one's family in the larger historical picture, a sense of responsibility to preserve the past for future generations, and self-satisfaction in accurate storytelling. Genealogy research is also performed for scholarly or forensic purposes, or to trace legal next of kin to inherit under intestacy laws.

== Overview ==
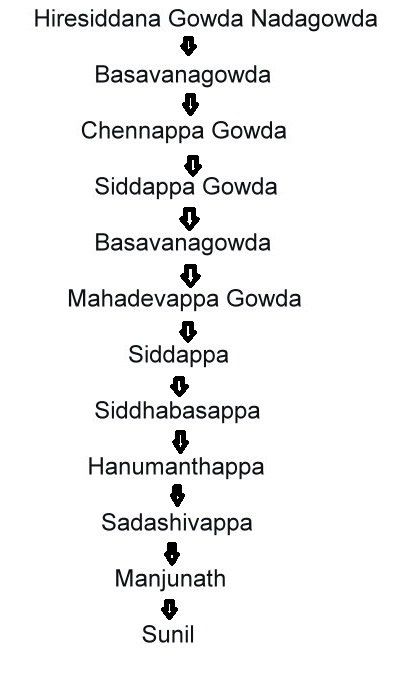
Twelve generations patrilineage of a Hindu Lingayat male from central Karnataka spanning over 275 years, depicted in descending order

Amateur genealogists typically pursue their own ancestry and that of their spouses. Professional genealogists may also conduct research for others, publish books on genealogical methods, teach, or produce their own databases. They may work for companies that provide software or produce materials of use to other professionals and to amateurs. Both try to understand not just where and when people lived but also their lifestyles, biographies, and motivations. This often requires—or leads to—knowledge of antiquated laws, old political boundaries, migration trends, and historical socioeconomic or religious conditions.

Genealogists sometimes specialize in a particular group, e.g., a Scottish clan; a particular surname, such as in a one-name study; a small community, e.g., a single village or parish, such as in a one-place study; or a particular, often famous, person. Bloodlines of Salem is an example of a specialized family-history group. It welcomes members who can prove descent from a participant of the Salem Witch Trials or who simply choose to support the group.

Genealogists and family historians often join family history societies, where novices can learn from more experienced researchers. Such societies generally serve a specific geographical area. Their members may also index records to make them more accessible or engage in advocacy and other efforts to preserve public records and cemeteries. Some schools engage students in such projects as a means to reinforce lessons regarding immigration and history. Other benefits include family medical histories for families with serious medical conditions that are hereditary.

The terms "genealogy" and "family history" are often used synonymously, but some entities offer a slight difference in definition. The Society of Genealogists, while also using the terms interchangeably, describes genealogy as the "establishment of a pedigree by extracting evidence, from valid sources, of how one generation is connected to the next" and family history as "a biographical study of a genealogically proven family and of the community and country in which they lived".

== Motivation ==
Individuals conduct genealogical research for a number of reasons.

=== Personal or medical interest ===
Private individuals research genealogy out of curiosity about their heritage. This curiosity can be particularly strong among those whose family histories were lost or unknown due to, for example, adoption or separation from family through divorce, death, or other situations. In addition to simply wanting to know more about who they are and where they came from, individuals may research their genealogy to learn about any hereditary diseases in their family history.

There is a growing interest in family history in the media as a result of advertising and television shows sponsored by large genealogy companies, such as Ancestry.com. This, coupled with easier access to online records and the affordability of DNA tests, has both inspired curiosity and allowed those who are curious to easily start investigating their ancestry.

=== Community or religious obligation ===
In communitarian societies, one's identity is defined as much by one's kin network as by individual achievement, and the question "Who are you?" would be answered by a description of father, mother, and tribe. New Zealand Māori, for example, learn whakapapa (genealogies) to discover who they are.

Family history plays a part in the practice of some religious belief systems. For example, The Church of Jesus Christ of Latter-day Saints (LDS Church) has a doctrine of baptism for the dead, which necessitates that members of that faith engage in family history research.

In East Asian countries that were historically shaped by Confucianism, many people follow a practice of ancestor worship as well as genealogical record-keeping. Ancestors' names are inscribed on tablets and placed in shrines, where rituals are performed. Genealogies are also recorded in genealogy books. This practice is rooted in the belief that respect for one's family is a foundation for a healthy society.

=== Establishing identity ===
Royal families, both historically and in modern times, keep records of their genealogies in order to establish their right to rule and determine who will be the next sovereign. For centuries in various cultures, one's genealogy has been a source of political and social status.

Some countries and indigenous tribes allow individuals to obtain citizenship based on their genealogy. In Ireland and in Greece, for example, an individual can become a citizen if one of their grandparents was born in that country, regardless of their own or their parents' birthplace. In societies such as Australia or the United States, by the 20th century, there was growing pride in the pioneers and nation-builders. Establishing descent from these was, and is, important to lineage societies, such as the Daughters of the American Revolution and The General Society of Mayflower Descendants. Modern family history explores new sources of status, such as celebrating the resilience of families that survived generations of poverty or slavery, or the success of families in integrating across racial or national boundaries. Some family histories even emphasize links to celebrity criminals, such as the bushranger Ned Kelly in Australia.

=== Legal and forensic research ===
Lawyers involved in probate cases do genealogy to locate heirs of property.

Detectives may perform genealogical research using DNA evidence to identify victims of homicides or perpetrators of crimes.

=== Scholarly research ===
Historians and geneticists may carry out genealogical research to gain a greater understanding of specific topics in their respective fields, some others may employ professional genealogists in connection with specific aspects of their research. They also publish their research in peer-reviewed journals.

Classical genealogics refers to the academic discipline or practice of compiling genealogical charts and genealogies, and is characterized by the absence of discursive argumentation.

Traditional genealogy refers to the academic discipline that, based on the terminology and methods of historical studies and historical source criticism, studies genealogical records pertaining to clans, courtesy names, titles, clans, and lineages, as well as various matters attendant upon their historical transitions.

The introduction of postgraduate courses in genealogy in recent years has given genealogy more of an academic focus, with the emergence of peer-reviewed journals in this area. Scholarly genealogy is beginning to emerge as a discipline in its own right, with an increasing number of individuals who have obtained genealogical qualifications carrying out research on a diverse range of topics related to genealogy, both within academic institutions and independently.

On the other hand, "Genealogical Science" is a discipline that does not depend on historical studies or source criticism, and aims to elucidate the true composition of kinship across generations, to clarify the typologies, tendencies, and changes of phenomena relating to genealogies and pedigrees, and to compile and construct genealogical compilations, encyclopedias, and other databases. The world's first comprehensive theoretical system of genealogical science has been constructed by Yuya Kinoshita.

=== Discrimination and persecution ===
In the US, the "one-drop rule" asserted that any person with even one ancestor of black ancestry ("one drop" of "black blood") was considered black. It was codified into the law of some States (e.g. the Racial Integrity Act of 1924) to reinforce racial segregation.

Genealogy was also used in Nazi Germany to determine whether a person was considered a "Jew" or a "Mischling" (Mischling Test), and whether a person was considered as "Aryan" (Ahnenpass).

== History ==
=== Pre-modern genealogy ===
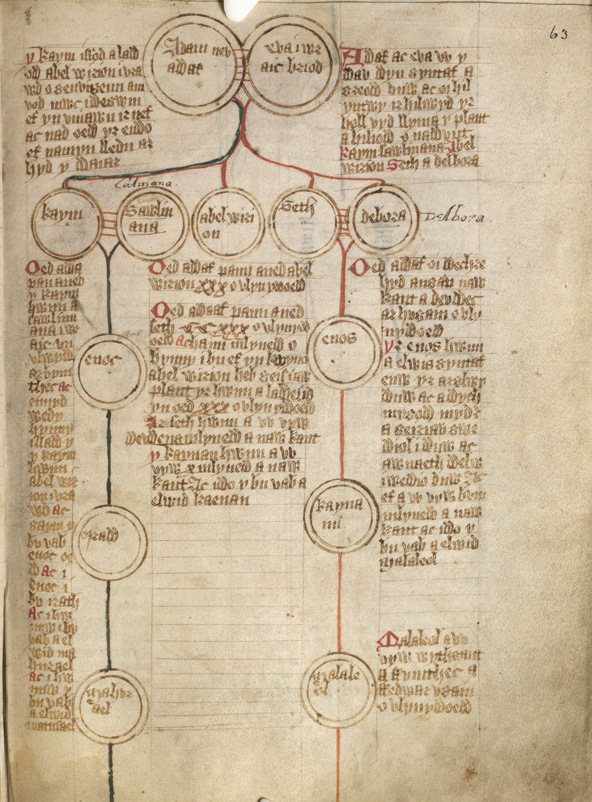
A Medieval genealogy traced from Adam and Eve

Hereditary emperors, kings and chiefs in several areas have long claimed descent from gods (thus establishing divine legitimacy). Court genealogists have preserved or invented appropriate genealogical pretensions - for example in Japan, Polynesia, and the Indo-European world from Scandinavia through ancient Greece to India.

Historically, in Western societies, genealogy focused on the kinship and descent of rulers and nobles, often arguing or demonstrating the legitimacy of claims to wealth and power. Genealogy often overlapped with heraldry, which reflected the ancestry of noble houses in their coats of arms. Modern scholars regard many claimed noble ancestries as fabrications, such as the Anglo-Saxon Chronicle's tracing of the ancestry of several English kings to the god Woden. With the coming of Christianity to northern Europe, Anglo-Saxon royal genealogies extended the kings' lines of ancestry from Woden back to reach the line of Biblical patriarchs: Noah and Adam. (This extension offered the side-benefit of connecting pretentious rulers with the prestigious genealogy of Jesus.)

Modern historians and genealogists may regard manufactured pseudo-genealogies with a degree of scepticism. However, the desire to find ancestral links with prominent figures from a legendary or distant past has persisted. In the United States, for example, it does no harm to establish one's links to ancestors who boarded the Mayflower. And the popularity of the genealogical hypothesis of The Holy Blood and the Holy Grail (1982) demonstrates popular interest in ancient bloodlines, however dubious.

Some family trees have been maintained for considerable periods. The family tree of Confucius has been maintained for over 2,500 years and is listed in the Guinness Book of World Records as the largest extant family tree. The fifth edition of the Confucius Genealogy was printed in 2009 by the Confucius Genealogy Compilation Committee (CGCC).

=== Modern times ===
In modern times, genealogy has become more widespread, with commoners as well as nobility researching and maintaining their family trees. Genealogy received a boost in the late 1970s with the television broadcast of Roots: The Saga of an American Family by Alex Haley. His account of his family's descent from the African tribesman Kunta Kinte inspired many others to study their own lines.

With the advent of the Internet, the number of resources readily accessible to genealogists has vastly increased, fostering an explosion of interest in the topic. Genealogy on the internet became increasingly popular starting in the early 2000s. The Internet has become a major source not only of data for genealogists but also of education and communication.

=== By country ===
==== China ====
Genealogy in China was originally a royal and noble pursuit but began to be practiced by commoners during the Ming and Qing dynasties. Traditional Chinese genealogies start with the common ancestor, documenting all descendants of such individual. A common method to document kinship ties was via genealogy books, such as a zupu (族谱) or jiapu (家谱). During the Cultural Revolution, genealogy was shunned as a backwards practice and saw a decline. Interest in genealogy was revived in the 1980s, with a more egalitarian focus by including women of the family in lineages.

==== India ====
In India, there are two broad types of traditional genealogists: those who work in places where the Ganges river flows and those who work in other locations. Each caste grouping in the Indian subcontinent has different kinds of genealogists, who have a set of inter-generational patrons, called jajmans. Usually, a traditional genealogist would visit their jajman's house and record information in the presence of the patron family and other witnesses in their pothis (record-books), passed on from one to another. All the vital details about a particular family are recorded in the pothi, such as births, deaths, marriages, divisions in the family, and donations made for religious purposes. Two major genealogical traditions in the Indian subcontinent are Panda Bahi, produced by Tirth Purohits/Pandas at places of pilgrimage, and Bhatt Bahi, produced by wandering Bhats serving local clientele. In the Mithila region of the Indian subcontinent, the genealogical record of Maithil Brahmins and Kayastha were recorded through the Panjis system.

Traditional genealogists played a role in the 1857 rebellion, as they spread word door-to-door. Due to this, many genealogists were killed by the British and others migrated to different parts of India away from their hometown. However, traditional genealogy in India is a dying practice due to urbanization, migration abroad, the impact of the Internet, modern technology, and monetary and economic concerns.

There are more than twenty-five places of pilgrimage across India where genealogical records on the families of visiting pilgrims are kept by pandas (Hindu priests). Some notable places where traditional genealogy records are kept include Hindu genealogy registers at Haridwar (Uttarakhand), Varanasi and Allahabad (Uttar Pradesh), Kurukshetra (Haryana), Trimbakeshwar (Maharashtra), and Chintpurni (Himachal Pradesh). In February 2025, the National Archives of India announced it was planning on creating a publicly-accessible database of genealogical records sourced from pothis kept in the collection of pandas (priests) from Gaya, Kashi, Prayagraj, Kedarnath, Ujjain, Badrinath, and other places of pilgrimage where familial genealogical records are kept and maintained.

Genealogy records related to land-records and ownership are shajras and kursinamas.

==== United States ====
Genealogical research in the United States was first systematized in the early 19th century, especially by John Farmer (1789–1838). Before Farmer's efforts, tracing one's genealogy was seen as an attempt by the American colonists to secure a measure of social standing, an aim that was counter to the new republic's egalitarian, future-oriented ideals (as outlined in the Constitution). As Fourth of July celebrations commemorating the Founding Fathers and the heroes of the Revolutionary War became increasingly popular, however, the pursuit of "antiquarianism", which focused on local history, became acceptable as a way to honor the achievements of early Americans. Farmer capitalized on the acceptability of antiquarianism to frame genealogy within the early republic's ideological framework of pride in one's American ancestors. He corresponded with other antiquarians in New England, where antiquarianism and genealogy were well established, and became a coordinator, booster, and contributor to the growing movement. In the 1820s, he and fellow antiquarians began to produce genealogical and antiquarian tracts in earnest, slowly gaining a devoted audience among the American people. Though Farmer died in 1838, his efforts led to the founding in 1845 of the New England Historic Genealogical Society (NEHGS), one of New England's oldest and most prominent organizations dedicated to the preservation of public records. NEHGS publishes the New England Historical and Genealogical Register.

The Genealogical Society of Utah, founded in 1894, later became the Family History Department of the Church of Jesus Christ of Latter-day Saints. The department's research facility, the Family History Library, which Utah.com claims as "the largest genealogical library in the world", was established to assist in tracing family lineages for special religious ceremonies which Latter-day Saints believe will seal family units together for eternity. Latter-day Saints believe that this fulfilled a biblical prophecy stating that the prophet Elijah would return to "turn the heart of the fathers to the children, and the heart of the children to their fathers." There is a network of church-operated Family History Centers all over the United States and around the world, where volunteers assist the public with tracing their ancestors. Brigham Young University offers bachelor's degree, minor, and concentration programs in Family History and is the only school in North America to offer this.

The American Society of Genealogists is the scholarly honorary society of the U.S. genealogical field. Founded by John Insley Coddington, Arthur Adams, and Meredith B. Colket Jr., in December 1940, its membership is limited to 50 living fellows. ASG has semi-annually published The Genealogist, a scholarly journal of genealogical research, since 1980. Fellows of the American Society of Genealogists, who bear the post-nominal acronym "FASG", have written some of the most notable genealogical materials of the last half-century.

Some of the most notable scholarly American genealogical journals include The American Genealogist, National Genealogical Society Quarterly, The New England Historical and Genealogical Register, The New York Genealogical and Biographical Record, and The Genealogist.

== Research process ==
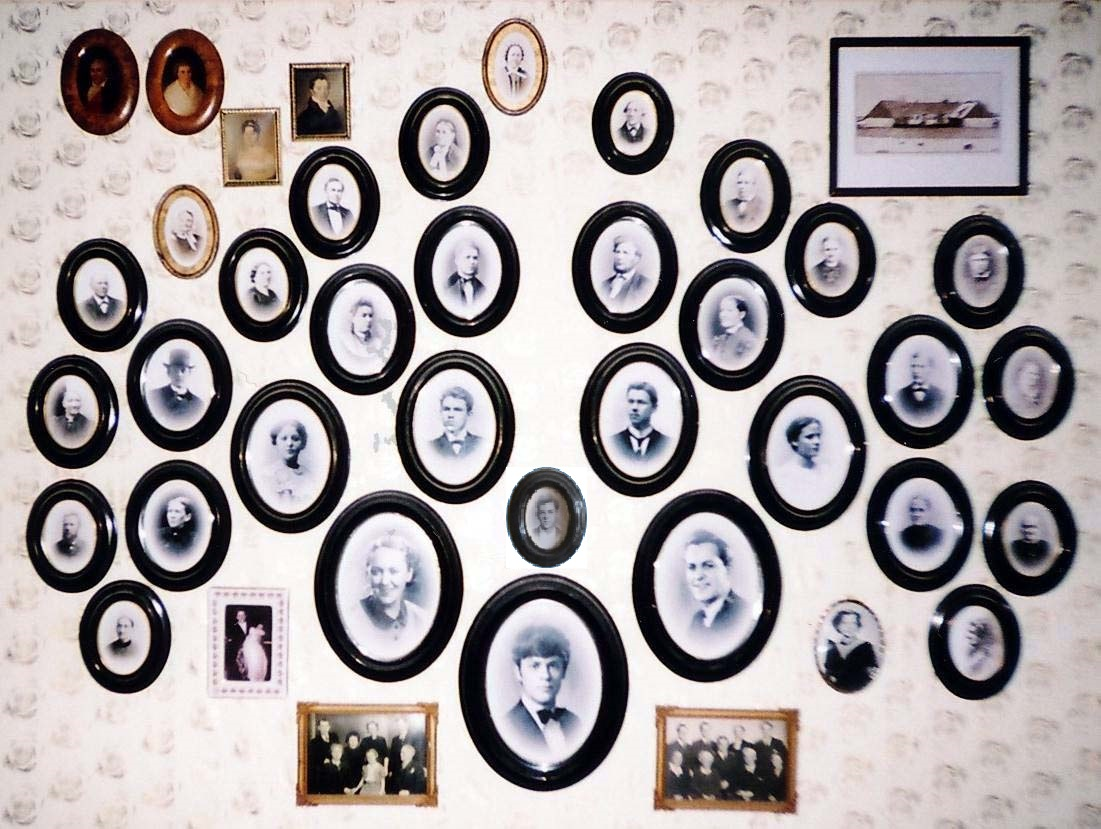
30 years of image research arranged genealogically on a kitchen wall in Sweden 2019

Genealogical research is a complex process that uses historical records and sometimes genetic analysis to demonstrate kinship. Reliable conclusions are based on the quality of sources (ideally, original records), the information within those sources, (ideally, primary or firsthand information), and the evidence that can be drawn (directly or indirectly), from that information. In many instances, genealogists must skillfully assemble indirect or circumstantial evidence to build a case for identity and kinship. All evidence and conclusions, together with the documentation that supports them, is then assembled to create a cohesive genealogy or family history.

Genealogists begin their research by collecting family documents and stories. This creates a foundation for documentary research, which involves examining and evaluating historical records for evidence about ancestors and other relatives, their kinship ties, and the events that occurred in their lives. As a rule, genealogists begin with the present and work backwards in time. Historical, social, and family context is essential to achieving correct identification of individuals and relationships. Source citation is also important when conducting genealogical research. To keep track of collected material, family group sheets and pedigree charts are used. Formerly handwritten, these can now be generated by genealogical software.

=== Genetic analysis ===
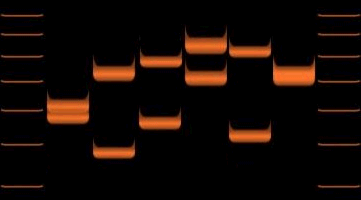
Variations of VNTR allele lengths in six individuals

Because a person's DNA contains information that has been passed down relatively unchanged from early ancestors, analysis of DNA is sometimes used for genealogical research. Three DNA types are of particular interest. Mitochondrial DNA (mtDNA) is contained in the mitochondria of the egg cell and is passed down from a mother to all of her children, both male and female; however, only females pass it on to their children. Y-DNA is present only in males and is passed down from a father to his sons (direct male line) with only minor mutations occurring over time. Autosomal DNA (atDNA), is found in the 22 non-sex chromosomes (autosomes) and is inherited from both parents; thus, it can uncover relatives from any branch of the family. A genealogical DNA test allows two individuals to find the probability that they are, or are not, related within an estimated number of generations. Individual genetic test results are collected in databases to match people descended from a relatively recent common ancestor. See, for example, the Molecular Genealogy Research Project. Some tests are limited to either the patrilineal or the matrilineal line.

=== Collaboration ===
Most genealogy software programs can export information about persons and their relationships in a standardized format called a GEDCOM. In that format, it can be shared with other genealogists, added to databases, or converted into family web sites. Social networking service (SNS) websites allow genealogists to share data and build their family trees online. Members can upload their family trees and contact other family historians to fill in gaps in their research. In addition to the (SNS) websites, there are other resources that encourage genealogists to connect and share information, such as rootsweb.ancestry.com and rsl.rootsweb.ancestry.com.

=== Volunteerism ===
Volunteer efforts figure prominently in genealogy. These range from the extremely informal to the highly organized.

On the informal side are the many popular and useful message boards such as Rootschat and mailing lists on particular surnames, regions, and other topics. These forums can be used to try to find relatives, request record lookups, obtain research advice, and much more. Many genealogists participate in loosely organized projects, both online and off. These collaborations take numerous forms. Some projects prepare name indexes for records, such as probate cases, and publish the indexes, either online or off. These indexes can be used as finding aids to locate original records. Other projects transcribe or abstract records. Offering record lookups for particular geographic areas is another common service. Volunteers do record lookups or take photos in their home areas for researchers who are unable to travel.

Those looking for a structured volunteer environment can join one of thousands of genealogical societies worldwide. Most societies have a unique area of focus, such as a particular surname, ethnicity, geographic area, or descendancy from participants in a given historical event. Genealogical societies are almost exclusively staffed by volunteers and may offer a broad range of services, including maintaining libraries for members' use, publishing newsletters, providing research assistance to the public, offering classes or seminars, and organizing record preservation or transcription projects.

=== Software ===
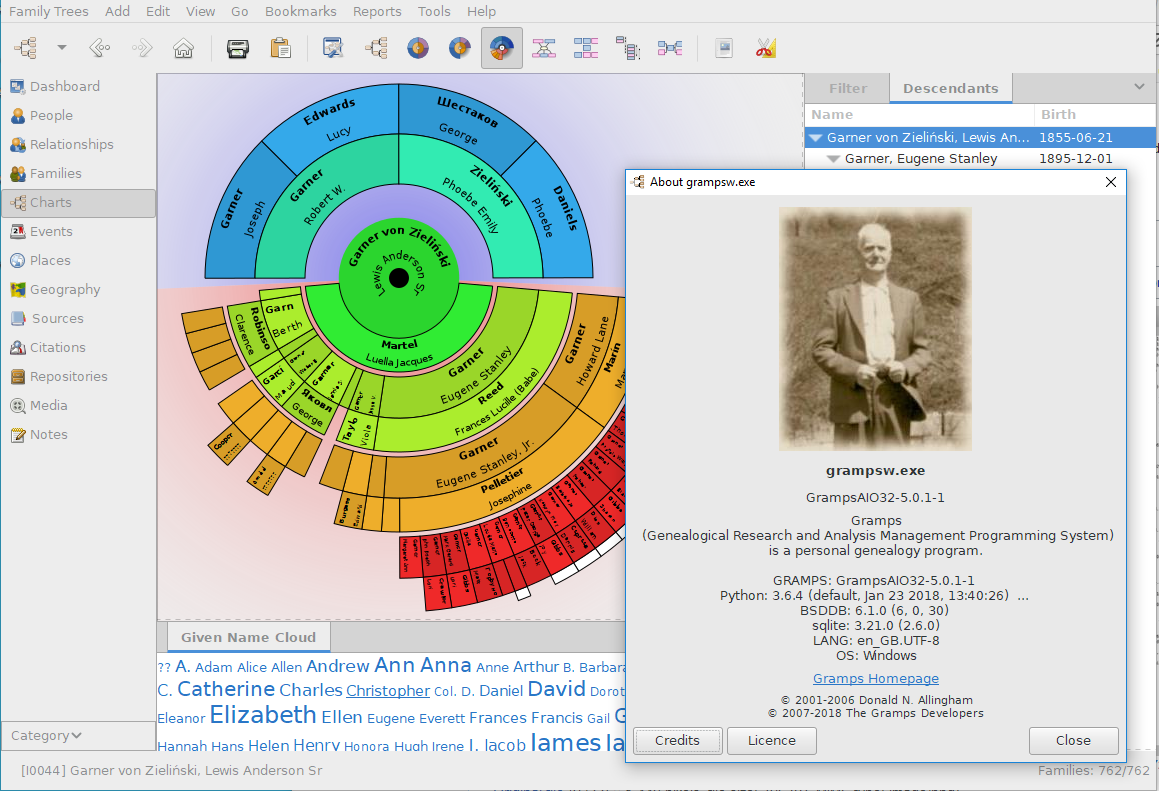
Gramps is an example of genealogy software.

Genealogy software is used to collect, store, sort, and display genealogical data. At a minimum, genealogy software accommodates basic information about individuals, including births, marriages, and deaths. Many programs allow for additional biographical information, including occupation, residence, and notes, and most also offer a method for keeping track of the sources for each piece of evidence.

Most programs can generate basic kinship charts and reports, allow for the import of digital photographs and the export of data in the GEDCOM format (short for GEnealogical Data COMmunication) so that data can be shared with those using other genealogy software. More advanced features include the ability to restrict the information that is shared, usually by removing information about living people out of privacy concerns; the import of sound files; the generation of family history books, web pages and other publications; the ability to handle same-sex marriages and children born out of wedlock; searching the Internet for data; and the provision of research guidance. Programs may be geared toward a specific religion, with fields relevant to that religion, or to specific nationalities or ethnic groups, with source types relevant for those groups. Online resources involve complex programming and large data bases, such as censuses.

== Records and documentation ==
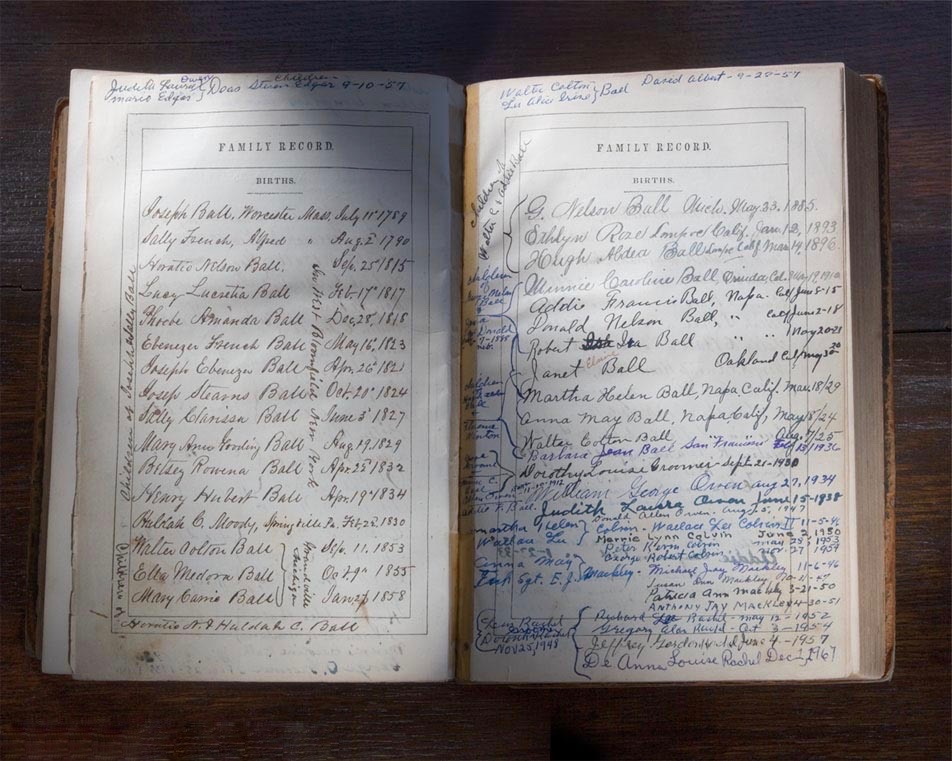
A family history page from an antebellum era family Bible

Genealogists use a wide variety of records in their research. To effectively conduct genealogical research, it is important to understand how the records were created, what information is included in them, and how and where to access them.

=== List of record types ===
Records that are used in genealogy research include:

- Vital records
  - Birth records
  - Death records
  - Marriage and divorce records
- Adoption records
- Biographies and biographical profiles (e.g. Who's Who)
- Cemetery lists
- Census records
- Church and Religious records
  - Baptism or christening
  - Brit milah or Baby naming certificates
  - Confirmation
  - Bar or bat mitzvah
  - Marriage
  - Funeral or death
  - Membership
- City directories and telephone directories
- Coroner's reports
- Court records
  - Criminal records
  - Civil records
- Diaries, personal letters and family Bibles
- DNA tests
- Emigration, immigration and naturalization records
- Hereditary & lineage organization records, e.g. Daughters of the American Revolution records
- Land and property records, deeds
- Medical records
- Military and conscription records
- Newspaper articles
- Obituaries
- Occupational records
- Oral histories
- Passports
- Photographs
- Poorhouse, workhouse, almshouse, and asylum records
- School and alumni association records
- Ship passenger lists
- Social Security (within the US) and pension records
- Tax records
- Tombstones, cemetery records, and funeral home records
- Voter registration records
- Wills and probate records

To keep track of their citizens, governments began keeping records of persons who were neither royalty nor nobility. In England and Germany, for example, such record keeping started with parish registers in the 16th century. As more of the population was recorded, there were sufficient records to follow a family. Major life events, such as births, marriages, and deaths, were often documented with a license, permit, or report. Genealogists locate these records in local, regional or national offices or archives and extract information about family relationships and recreate timelines of persons' lives.

In China, India and other Asian countries, genealogy books are used to record the names, occupations, and other information about family members, with some books dating back hundreds or even thousands of years. In the eastern Indian state of Bihar, there is a written tradition of genealogical records among Maithil Brahmins and Karna Kayasthas called "Panjis", dating to the 12th century CE. Even today these records are consulted prior to marriages.

In Ireland, genealogical records were recorded by professional families of senchaidh (historians) until as late as the mid-17th century. Perhaps the most outstanding example of this genre is Leabhar na nGenealach/The Great Book of Irish Genealogies, by Dubhaltach MacFhirbhisigh (d. 1671), published in 2004.

=== FamilySearch collections ===
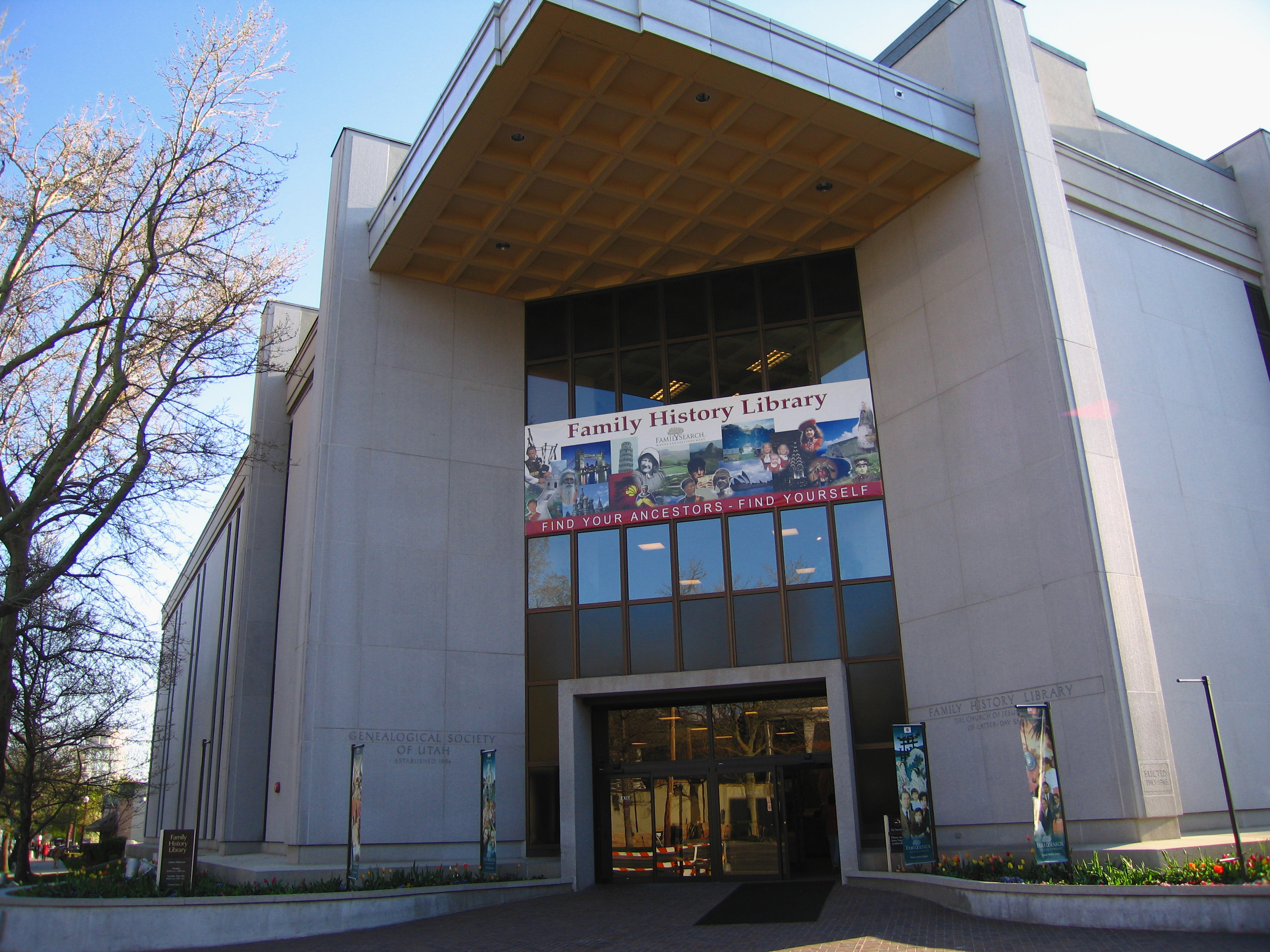
The Family History Library, operated by the Church of Jesus Christ of Latter-day Saints, is the world's largest library dedicated to genealogical research.

The LDS Church has engaged in large-scale microfilming of records of genealogical value. Its Family History Library in Salt Lake City, Utah, houses over 2 million microfiche and microfilms of genealogically relevant material, which are also available for on-site research at over 4,500 Family History Centers worldwide.

FamilySearch's website includes many resources for genealogists: a FamilyTree database, historical records, digitized family history books, resources and indexing for African American genealogy such as slave and bank records, and a Family History Research Wiki containing research guidance articles.

=== Indexing ancestral information ===
Indexing is the process of transcribing parish records, city vital records, and other reports, to a digital database for searching. Volunteers and professionals participate in the indexing process. Since 2006, the microfilm in the FamilySearch granite mountain vault is in the process of being digitally scanned, available online, and eventually indexed.

For example, after the 72-year legal limit for releasing personal information for the United States Census was reached in 2012, genealogical groups cooperated to index the 132 million residents registered in the 1940 United States census.

Between 2006 and 2012, the FamilySearch indexing effort produced more than 1 billion searchable records.

In 2022, FamilySearch and Ancestry partnered to use Artificial Intelligence (AI) technology to help the process of indexing more records. The process first began with the public release of the 1950 United States Census. The index of the census would at first be created by an AI trained on handwriting in old documents and then reviewed by thousands of volunteers using FamilySearch.

=== Record loss and preservation ===
Sometimes genealogical records are destroyed, whether accidentally or on purpose. In order to do thorough research, genealogists keep track of which records have been destroyed so they know when information they need may be missing. Of particular note for North American genealogy is the 1890 United States census, which was destroyed in a fire in 1921. Although fragments survive, most of the 1890 census no longer exists. Those looking for genealogical information for families that lived in the United States in 1890 must rely on other information to fill that gap.

War is another cause of record destruction. During World War II, many European records were destroyed. Communists in China during the Cultural Revolution and in Korea during the Korean War destroyed genealogy books kept by families.

Often records are destroyed due to accident or neglect. Since genealogical records are often kept on paper and stacked in high-density storage, they are prone to fire, mold, insect damage, and eventual disintegration. Sometimes records of genealogical value are deliberately destroyed by governments or organizations because the records are considered to be unimportant or a privacy risk. Because of this, genealogists often organize efforts to preserve records that are at risk of destruction. FamilySearch has an ongoing program that assesses what useful genealogical records have the most risk of being destroyed, and sends volunteers to digitize such records. In 2017, the government of Sierra Leone asked FamilySearch for help preserving their rapidly deteriorating vital records. FamilySearch has begun digitizing the records and making them available online. The Federation of Genealogical Societies also organized an effort to preserve and digitize United States War of 1812 pension records. In 2010, they began raising funds, which were contribute by genealogists around the United States and matched by Ancestry.com. Their goal was achieved and the process of digitization was able to begin. The digitized records are available for free online.

== Types of information ==
Genealogists who seek to reconstruct the lives of each ancestor consider all historical information to be "genealogical" information. Traditionally, the basic information needed to ensure correct identification of each person are place names, occupations, family names, first names, and dates. However, modern genealogists greatly expand this list, recognizing the need to place this information in its historical context in order to properly evaluate genealogical evidence and distinguish between same-name individuals. A great deal of information is available for British ancestry with growing resources for other ethnic groups.

=== Family names ===
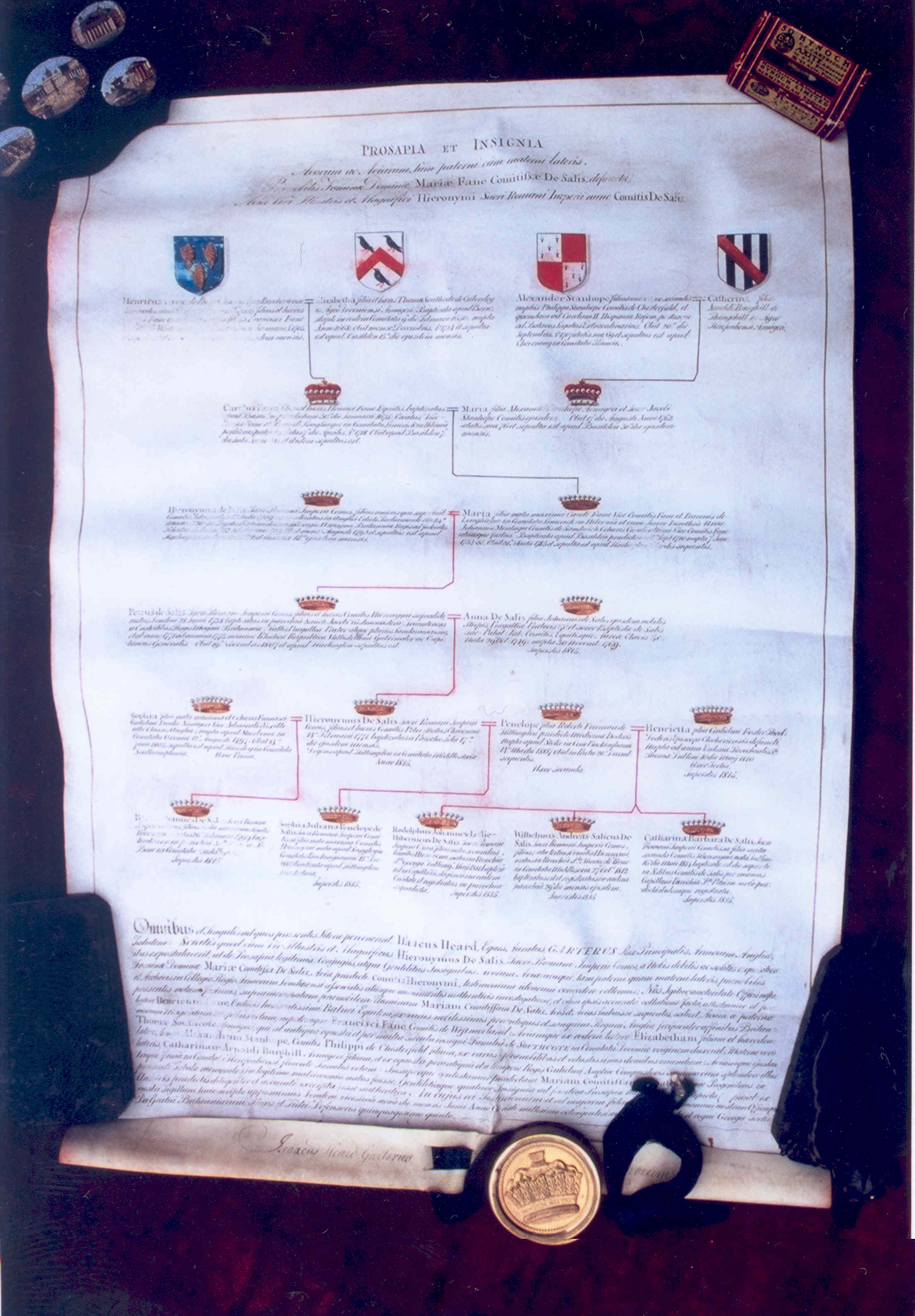
Lineage of a family, c. 1809

Family names are simultaneously one of the most important pieces of genealogical information, and a source of significant confusion for researchers.

In many cultures, the name of a person refers to the family to which they belong. This is called the family name, surname, or last name. Patronymics are names that identify an individual based on the father's name. For example, Marga Olafsdottir is Marga, daughter of Olaf, and Olaf Thorsson is Olaf, son of Thor. Many cultures used patronymics before surnames were adopted or came into use. The Dutch in New York, for example, used the patronymic system of names until 1687 when the advent of English rule mandated surname usage. In Iceland, patronymics are used by a majority of the population. In Denmark and Norway patronymics and farm names were generally in use through the 19th century and beyond, though surnames began to come into fashion toward the end of the 19th century in some parts of the country. Not until 1856 in Denmark and 1923 in Norway were there laws requiring surnames.

The transmission of names across generations, marriages and other relationships, and immigration may cause difficulty in genealogical research. For instance, women in many cultures have routinely used their spouse's surnames. When a woman remarried, she may have changed her name and the names of her children; only her name; or changed no names. Her birth name (maiden name) may be reflected in her children's middle names; her own middle name; or dropped entirely. Children may sometimes assume stepparent, foster parent, or adoptive parent names. Because official records may reflect many kinds of surname change, without explaining the underlying reason for the change, the correct identification of a person recorded identified with more than one name is challenging. Immigrants to America often Americanized their names.

Surname data may be found in trade directories, census returns, birth, death, and marriage records.

=== Given names ===
Genealogical data regarding given names (first names) is subject to many of the same problems as are family names and place names. Additionally, the use of nicknames is very common. For example, Beth, Lizzie or Betty are all common for Elizabeth, and Jack, John and Jonathan may be interchanged.

Middle names provide additional information. Middle names may be inherited, follow naming customs, or be treated as part of the family name. For instance, in some Latin cultures, both the mother's family name and the father's family name are used by the children.

Historically, naming traditions existed in some places and cultures. Even in areas that tended to use naming conventions, however, they were by no means universal. Families may have used them some of the time, among some of their children, or not at all. A pattern might also be broken to name a newborn after a recently deceased sibling, aunt or uncle.

An example of a naming tradition from England, Scotland and Ireland:

Child	Namesake
1st son	paternal grandfather
2nd son	maternal grandfather
3rd son	father
4th son	father's oldest brother
1st daughter	maternal grandmother
2nd daughter	paternal grandmother
3rd daughter	mother
4th daughter	mother's oldest sister

Another example is in some areas of Germany, where siblings were given the same first name, often of a favourite saint or local nobility, but different second names by which they were known (Rufname). If a child died, the next child of the same gender that was born may have been given the same name. It is not uncommon that a list of a particular couple's children will show one or two names repeated.

Personal names have periods of popularity, so it is not uncommon to find many similarly named people in a generation, and even similarly named families; e.g., "William and Mary and their children David, Mary, and John".

Many names may be identified strongly with a particular gender; e.g., William for boys, and Mary for girls. Others may be ambiguous, e.g., Lee, or have only slightly variant spellings based on gender, e.g., Frances (usually female) and Francis (usually male).

=== Place names ===
While the locations of ancestors' residences and life events are core elements of the genealogist's quest, they can often be confusing. Place names may be subject to variant spellings by partially literate scribes. Locations may have identical or very similar names. For example, the village name Brockton occurs six times in the border area between the English counties of Shropshire and Staffordshire. Shifts in political borders must also be understood. Parish, county, and national borders have frequently been modified. Old records may contain references to farms and villages that have ceased to exist. When working with older records from Poland, where borders and place names have changed frequently in past centuries, a source with maps and sample records such as A Translation Guide to 19th-Century Polish-Language Civil-Registration Documents can be invaluable.

Available sources may include vital records (civil or church registration), censuses, and tax assessments. Oral tradition is also an important source, although it must be used with caution. When no source information is available for a location, circumstantial evidence may provide a probable answer based on a person's or a family's place of residence at the time of the event.

Maps and gazetteers are important sources for understanding the places researched. They show the relationship of an area to neighboring communities and may be of help in understanding migration patterns. Family tree mapping using online mapping tools such as Google Earth (particularly when used with Historical Map overlays such as those from the David Rumsey Historical Map Collection) assist in the process of understanding the significance of geographical locations.

The study of the relationship between persons and their places of residence is also known as Residential Genealogy.

=== Dates ===
It is wise to exercise extreme caution with dates. Dates are more difficult to recall years after an event, and are more easily mistranscribed than other types of genealogical data. Therefore, one should determine whether the date was recorded at the time of the event or at a later date. Dates of birth in vital records or civil registrations and in church records at baptism are generally accurate because they were usually recorded near the time of the event. Family Bibles are often a source for dates, but can be written from memory long after the event. When the same ink and handwriting is used for all entries, the dates were probably written at the same time and therefore will be less reliable since the earlier dates were probably recorded well after the event. The publication date of the Bible also provides a clue about when the dates were recorded since they could not have been recorded at any earlier date.

People sometimes reduce their age on marriage, and those under "full age" may increase their age in order to marry or to join the armed forces. Census returns are notoriously unreliable for ages or for assuming an approximate death date. Ages over 15 in the 1841 census in the UK are rounded down to the next lower multiple of five years.

Although baptismal dates are often used to approximate birth dates, some families waited years before baptizing children, and adult baptisms are the norm in some religions. Both birth and marriage dates may have been adjusted to cover for pre-wedding pregnancies.

Calendar changes must also be considered. In 1752, England and her American colonies changed from the Julian to the Gregorian calendar. In the same year, the date the new year began was changed. Prior to 1752 it was 25 March; this was changed to 1 January. Many other European countries had already made the calendar changes before England had, sometimes centuries earlier. By 1751 there was an 11-day discrepancy between the date in England and the date in other European countries.

For further detail on the changes involved in moving from the Julian to the Gregorian calendar, see: Gregorian calendar.

The French Republican Calendar or French Revolutionary Calendar was a calendar proposed during the French Revolution, and used by the French government for about 12 years from late 1793 to 1805, and for 18 days in 1871 in Paris. Dates in official records at this time use the revolutionary calendar and need "translating" into the Gregorian calendar for calculating ages etc. There are various websites which do this.

=== Occupations ===
Occupational information may be important to understanding an ancestor's life and for distinguishing two people with the same name. A person's occupation may have been related to his or her social status, political interest, and migration pattern. Since skilled trades are often passed from father to son, occupation may also be indirect evidence of a family relationship.

It is important to remember that a person may change occupations, and that titles change over time as well. Some workers no longer fit for their primary trade often took less prestigious jobs later in life, while others moved upwards in prestige. Many unskilled ancestors had a variety of jobs depending on the season and local trade requirements. Census returns may contain some embellishment; e.g., from labourer to mason, or from journeyman to master craftsman. Names for old or unfamiliar local occupations may cause confusion if poorly legible. For example, an ostler (a keeper of horses) and a hostler (an innkeeper) could easily be confused for one another. Likewise, descriptions of such occupations may also be problematic. The perplexing description "ironer of rabbit burrows" may turn out to describe an ironer (profession) in the Bristol district named Rabbit Burrows. Several trades have regionally preferred terms. For example, "shoemaker" and "cordwainer" have the same meaning. Finally, many apparently obscure jobs are part of a larger trade community, such as watchmaking, framework knitting or gunmaking.

Occupational data may be reported in occupational licences, tax assessments, membership records of professional organizations, trade directories, census returns, and vital records (civil registration). Occupational dictionaries are available to explain many obscure and archaic trades.

== Reliability of sources ==
Information found in historical or genealogical sources can be unreliable and it is good practice to evaluate all sources with a critical eye. Factors influencing the reliability of genealogical information include: the knowledge of the informant (or writer); the bias and mental state of the informant (or writer); the passage of time and the potential for copying and compiling errors.

The quality of census data has been of special interest to historians, who have investigated reliability issues.

=== Knowledge of the informant ===
The informant is the individual who provided the recorded information. Genealogists must carefully consider who provided the information and what they knew. In many cases the informant is identified in the record itself. For example, a death certificate usually has two informants: a physician who provides information about the time and cause of death and a family member who provides the birth date, names of parents, etc.

When the informant is not identified, one can sometimes deduce information about the identity of the person by careful examination of the source. One should first consider who was alive (and nearby) when the record was created. When the informant is also the person recording the information, the handwriting can be compared to other handwriting samples.

When a source does not provide clues about the informant, genealogists should treat the source with caution. These sources can be useful if they can be compared with independent sources. For example, a census record by itself cannot be given much weight because the informant is unknown. However, when censuses for several years concur on a piece of information that would not likely be guessed by a neighbor, it is likely that the information in these censuses was provided by a family member or other informed person. On the other hand, information in a single census cannot be confirmed by information in an undocumented compiled genealogy since the genealogy may have used the census record as its source and might therefore be dependent on the same misinformed individual.

=== Motivation of the informant ===
Even individuals who had knowledge of the fact, sometimes intentionally or unintentionally provided false or misleading information. A person may have lied in order to obtain a government benefit (such as a military pension), avoid taxation, or cover up an embarrassing situation (such as the existence of a non-marital child). A person with a distressed state of mind may not be able to accurately recall information. Many genealogical records were recorded at the time of a loved one's death, and so genealogists should consider the effect that grief may have had on the informant of these records.

=== The effect of time ===
The passage of time often affects a person's ability to recall information. Therefore, as a general rule, data recorded soon after the event are usually more reliable than data recorded many years later. However, some types of data are more difficult to recall after many years than others. One type especially prone to recollection errors is dates. Also the ability to recall is affected by the significance that the event had to the individual. These values may have been affected by cultural or individual preferences.

=== Copying and compiling errors ===
Genealogists must consider the effects that copying and compiling errors may have had on the information in a source. For this reason, sources are generally categorized in two categories: original and derivative. An original source is one that is not based on another source. A derivative source is information taken from another source. This distinction is important because each time a source is copied, information about the record may be lost and errors may result from the copyist misreading, mistyping, or miswriting the information. Genealogists should consider the number of times information has been copied and the types of derivation a piece of information has undergone. The types of derivatives include: photocopies, transcriptions, abstracts, translations, extractions, and compilations.

In addition to copying errors, compiled sources (such as published genealogies and online pedigree databases) are susceptible to misidentification errors and incorrect conclusions based on circumstantial evidence. Identity errors usually occur when two or more individuals are assumed to be the same person. Circumstantial or indirect evidence does not explicitly answer a genealogical question, but either may be used with other sources to answer the question, suggest a probable answer, or eliminate certain possibilities. Compilers sometimes draw hasty conclusions from circumstantial evidence without sufficiently examining all available sources, without properly understanding the evidence, and without appropriately indicating the level of uncertainty.

=== Primary and secondary sources ===
In genealogical research, information can be obtained from primary or secondary sources. Primary sources are records that were made at the time of the event, for example a death certificate would be a primary source for a person's death date and place. Secondary sources are records that are made days, weeks, months, or even years after an event.

== Standards and ethics ==
Organizations that educate and certify genealogists have established standards and ethical guidelines they instruct genealogists to follow.

=== Research standards ===
Genealogy research requires analyzing documents and drawing conclusions based on the evidence provided in the available documents. Genealogists need standards to determine whether or not their evaluation of the evidence is accurate. In the past, genealogists in the United States borrowed terms from judicial law to examine evidence found in documents and how they relate to the researcher's conclusions. However, the differences between the two disciplines created a need for genealogists to develop their own standards. In 2000, the Board for Certification of Genealogists published their first manual of standards. The Genealogical Proof Standard created by the Board for Certification of Genealogists is widely distributed in seminars, workshops, and educational materials for genealogists in the United States. Other genealogical organizations around the world have created similar standards they invite genealogists to follow. Such standards provide guidelines for genealogists to evaluate their own research as well as the research of others.

Standards for genealogical research include:

- Clearly document and organize findings.
- Cite all sources in a specific manner so that others can locate them and properly evaluate them.
- Locate all available sources that may contain information relevant to the research question.
- Analyze findings thoroughly, without ignoring conflicts in records or negative evidence.
- Rely on original, rather than derivative sources, wherever possible.
- Use logical reasoning based on reliable sources to reach conclusions.
- Acknowledge when a specific conclusion is only "possible" or "probable" rather than "proven".
- Acknowledge that other records that have not yet been discovered may overturn a conclusion.

=== Ethical guidelines ===
Genealogists often handle sensitive information and share and publish such information. Because of this, there is a need for ethical standards and boundaries for when information is too sensitive to be published. Historically, some genealogists have fabricated information or have otherwise been untrustworthy. Genealogical organizations around the world have outlined ethical standards as an attempt to eliminate such problems. Ethical standards adopted by various genealogical organizations include:

- Respect copyright laws
- Acknowledge where one consulted another's work and do not plagiarize the work of other researchers.
- Treat original records with respect and avoid causing damage to them or removing them from repositories.
- Treat archives and archive staff with respect.
- Protect the privacy of living individuals by not publishing or otherwise disclosing information about them without their permission.
- Disclose any conflicts of interest to clients.
- When doing paid research, be clear with the client about scope of research and fees involved.
- Do not fabricate information or publish false or unproven information as proven.
- Be sensitive about information found through genealogical research that may make the client or family members uncomfortable.

In 2015, a committee presented standards for genetic genealogy at the Salt Lake Institute of Genealogy. The standards emphasize that genealogists and testing companies should respect the privacy of clients and recognize the limits of DNA tests. It also discusses how genealogists should thoroughly document conclusions made using DNA evidence. In 2019, the Board for the Certification of Genealogists officially updated their standards and code of ethics to include standards for genetic genealogy.

== See also ==
- Ahnentafel
- Cluster genealogy
- One-place study
- Descent from antiquity
- Dynasty
- Genealogical numbering systems
- Genealogy tourism
- International Museum for Family History
- List of genealogy databases
- List of Mormon family organizations
- List of national archives
