= Fellow of the American Society of Genealogists =

Fellow of the American Society of Genealogists (FASG) is an independent society of fellows reflecting the master class of genealogists within the United States of America. There are only fifty (50) lifetime FASG members within the American Society of Genealogists (ASG).

Fellows have the post-nominal initials FASG following their surnames. Fellows embody and promote the highest standards of genealogical scholarship.

== History ==
At the time of the ASG founding, there was no certification process or standard for competent genealogists. The American Society of Genealogists (ASG) founded in 1940 created a method to honor significant achievement in the genealogical field by 1944. Those meeting the standards of excellence are nominated and voted for within the ASG after a vacancy occurs.

== Criteria for nomination ==
Potential FASG members are reviewed for the following criteria.

- The quality of published work.
- Compiled genealogies.
- Demonstration to effectively "use primary source material; to evaluate and analyze data; to properly document evidence; and to reach sound, logical conclusions presented in a clear and proper manner."
