= National Genealogical Society =

The National Genealogical Society (NGS) is a genealogical interest group founded in 1903 in Washington, D.C., United States, with over 10,000 members. Its headquarters are in Falls Church, Virginia. The goals of the organization are to promote genealogical skill development, establish high standards of genealogical research, and increase awareness of and interest in family history. To accomplish this, the National Genealogical Society provides educational programs and training, publishes several publications in the field of genealogy, and creates networking opportunities for its members, including national conferences.

== History ==
The Society was incorporated in June of 1904 by C.H. Campbell, Susan R. Hetzel, J. F. Brandenburg, Ruth M. Grizwold Praler, Edwin Allston Hill, J. G. B. Bullock, Edward E. Wilson, and Mary Desha. The seven original Directors of the Society were Charles H. Campbell, Newton L. Collamer, Alfred S. Dent, Mrs. C. Minnie F. Mickey, and Joseph F. Brandenburg. At its incorporation, there were 49 charter members.

Preservation efforts undertaken in the first few years included the creation of a card index system to connect members with lineage records, advocating the United States Congress to publish Revolutionary War records of genealogical interest, and advocating for American Medical Association to implement uniform laws to record vital statistics,

== Publications ==
The NGS has published the National Genealogical Society Quarterly (NGSQ) since April 1912 and also publishes the NGS Magazine. Both publications accept submissions for publication.

The NGSQ is published in March, June, September, and December, and is mailed to dues paying members and other organizations that subscribe. Each issue is 80 pages long and covers a variety of genealogical research topics, including case studies, book reviews, original research, and more. Digital issues since 1912 are available for members on the NGS' digital archive, with an index available for free without a membership.

The NGS Magazine is also published four times a year and distributed to members and subscribing organizations. The magazine contains shorter articles than the NGSQ, with a focus on member engagement and popular genealogy tools and topics. Digital issues since 2005 are available for members on the NGS' digital archive.

== Programs and Events ==
In conjunction with a sponsoring local genealogical society, it stages the "NGS Family History Conference". The 2012 conference, in North Charleston, South Carolina, was attended by 2,000 people and hosted 150 lectures.
