= List of Groupe Bull products =

The following is a list of products from the French-owned computer hardware and software company Groupe Bull.

== Computer hardware ==
- Bull Gamma series
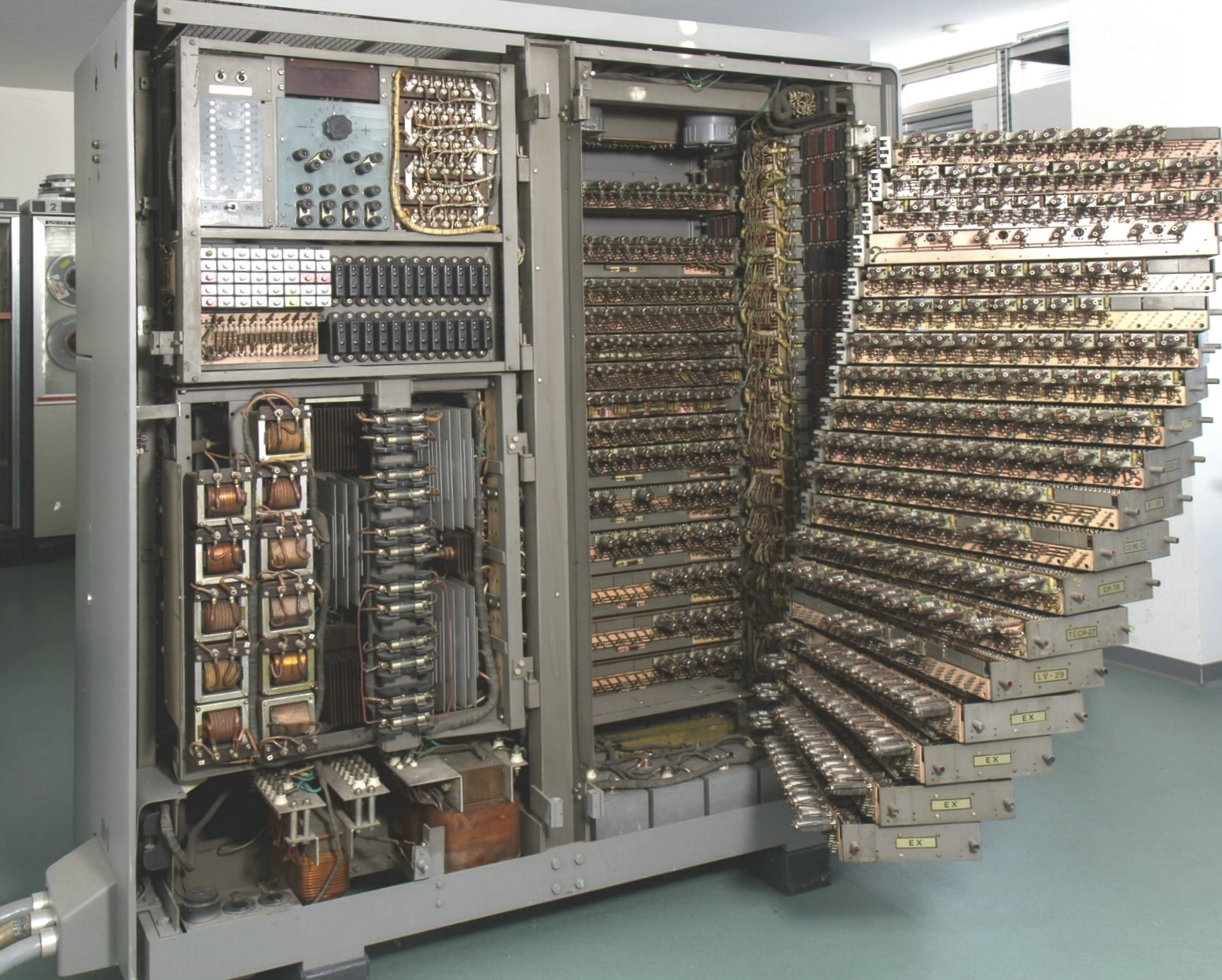
  - The Bull Gamma 3, 1952, one of the earliest commercial computers
    Gamma 3 (1952)
  - Gamma 55 (1967) (also known as GE 55)
  - Gamma 60 (1960)
  - Gamma 10 (1963)
  - Gamma 30 (1964) (RCA 301)
  - Gamma M 40 (1965)
- CAB 500 (1961, sold under license from Société d'Electronique et d'Automatisme)
- Série 300 TI (1962)
- GE-600 series (1965)
- GE 400 (1967)
- GE 115 (1966)
- GE-265 (1968)
- CII Iris 50 (1968)
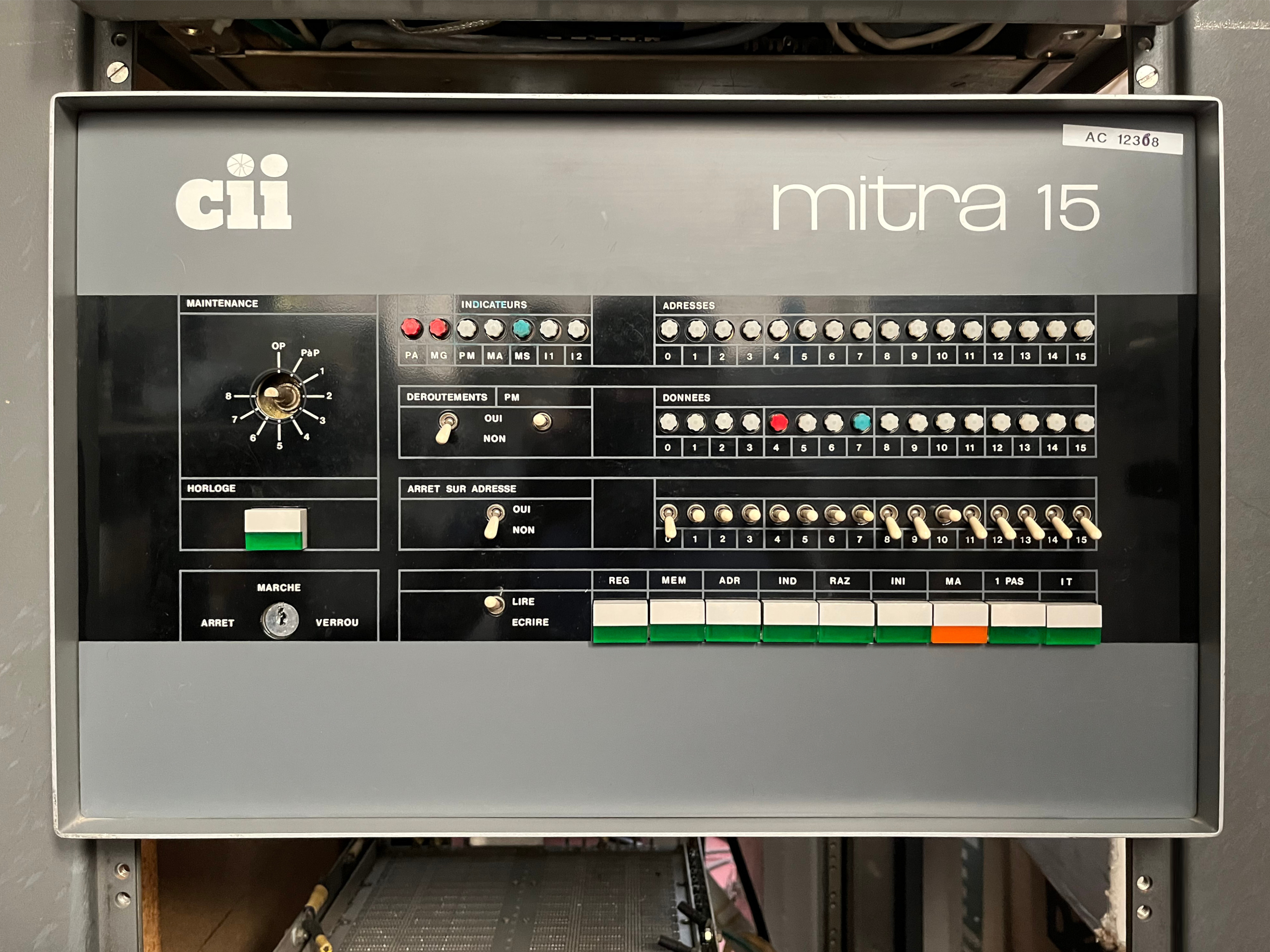
- A Mitra-15 minicomputer (1970)
  CII Mitra 15 (1970)
- GE 58 (1970)
- Honeywell 6000 series (1970)
- Honeywell H200 (1970)
- CII Iris 80 (1971)
- CII Iris 60 (1972)
- Honeywell 6180 for the Multics operating system (1973)
- HB 2000 (1973)
- Micral (1973)
- Mini6 (1978)
- CII HB 64/40 (1976)
- CII HB 66/60 (1976)
- CII HB 61 DPS (1978)
- Bull DS800 (2007)
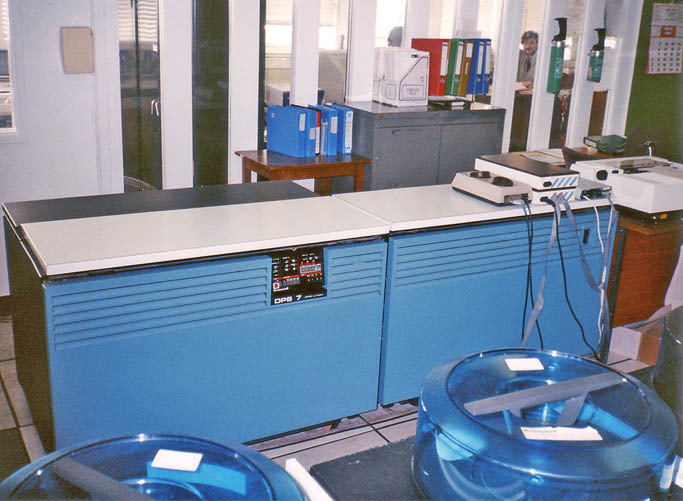
  A 1990 Honeywell-Bull DPS 7 mainframe
- Bull DPS series
  - DPS 4 (1980)
  - DPS 7 and DPS 7000 (1981)
  - DPS 6 series (1983)
  - DPS 8 (1984)
  - DPS 6 Plus and DPS 8000 (1987)
  - DPS 9000 (1999)
- Bull DPX series
  - Bull DPX 2 (1992)
  - Bull DPX 20
- SM 90 (1981)
- Correlative Syst. 1982
- SPS7 and SPS9
- Bull Escala (1994)
- Bull NovaScale (2004)
  - Novascale bullion (2010)
- Bull bullx (2009)
- Bull Estrella
- Bull Series 4000 Printing System (1988)

== Mobile phones ==
In October 2013 Groupe Bull introduced the Hoox line of cellular phones with enhanced encryption and biometric authentication targeting security-conscious users.

Models:

- Hoox m1 mobile phone
- Hoox m2 smartphone

== Computers on the TOP500 list ==
As of June 2012 Bull has 16 machines on the TOP500 supercomputer list

Rank	Rmax Rpeak^{(Tflops)}	Name	Computer Processor cores	Site Country, Year
9	1359; 1667	Curie thin nodes	Bull bullx B510 blades 77184 (Sandy Bridge), Infiniband	Commissariat à l'énergie atomique France, 2012
12	1237; 1524	Helios	Bull bullx B510 blades 70560 (Sandy Bridge), Infiniband	ITER; Japan, 2012
17	1050; 1254.55	Tera 100	Bull bullx super-node S6010/S6030; 138368 (Beckton), Infiniband	Commissariat à l'énergie atomique France, 2010
45	360; 442	Bull Benchmarks SuperComputer II	Bull bullx super-node S6010/S6030; 20480 (Sandy Bridge), Infiniband	Groupe Bull; France, 2012
63	274.80; 308.28	JUROPA	Bull HPC-FF Supercomputer; 26304 (Xeon), Infiniband	Jülich Research Centre; Germany, 2009
78	219.8; 270.5	RWTH Compute Cluster (RCC)	Bull bullx B500 blades 25448 (Westmere), Infiniband	RWTH; Germany, 2011
97	177.5; 203.9	Tera 100 hybrid nodes	Bull bullx B505 blades 9440 (Westmere), Infiniband	Commissariat à l'énergie atomique France, 2011
115	177.5; 203.9	Airin	Bull bullx B510 blades 9440 (Sandy Bridge), Infiniband	Commissariat à l'énergie atomique France, 2012
144	124.6; 145.15	Blackthorn	Bull bullx B500 cluster 12936 (Westmere)	Atomic Weapons Establishment; United Kingdom, 2010
168	108.5; 130	Titane	Bull Novascale R422-E2; 11520 (Xeon)	Commissariat à l'énergie atomique France, 2009
244	87.47; 104.6	Layon	Bull bullx super-node S6010/S6030; 11520 (Xeon)	Groupe Bull; France, 2010
245	57.47; 104.42	Curie fat nodes	Bull bullx super-node S6010; 11520 (Beckton)	Commissariat à l'énergie atomique France, 2010
245	85.9; 100.17	Cheops	Bull bullx Blade/Supernode; 9376 (Xeon)	University of Cologne; Germany, 2010
