= European Round Table for Industry =

The European Round Table for Industry (ERT) is a business advocacy group. It was previously known as the European Round Table of Industrialists. The group consists of approximately 60 chief executives of leading European multinational companies, mainly in the industrial and technology sectors.

The ERT promotes European competitiveness and prosperity, and aims "to strengthen Europe's place in the world" by encouraging cooperation between industry and policymakers. In contrast to the Confederation of European Business (BusinessEurope), which is made up of national business organizations and consists of enterprises of all sizes, the ERT represents large European firms that operate across countries in Europe and internationally. The focus of the ERT is on issues affecting the European economy as a whole.

Historically, the ERT has aimed to reinvigorate European industry through the promotion of a unified market (now called the European single market), high-technology cooperation, the creation of trans-European infrastructure, and improved European worker education and training.

== History ==
=== Impetus for the establishment of the ERT ===
The European economy in the early 1980s was suffering from "eurosclerosis", that is, a lack of innovation and competitiveness compared to the United States and Japan. Although the European economy was approximately the same size as that of the US, and its level of scientific development was broadly comparable, it was plagued by poor polices and fragmentation.

Pehr G. Gyllenhammar, the CEO of Volvo, and 17 European business leaders created an organization in 1983 to speak out about the European economic situation and European industrial policy. ERT members used the United States Business Roundtable, a group that meets with members of the United States Congress and the executive branch, as a partial model for their organization.

=== Early goals ===
The European single market has been described as "the issue that best defined the ERT's driving spirit". That is, to build a single internal market where goods, services, and capital could flow as freely within the EU as in the US. As well, the ERT has emphasized the need for adequate infrastructure links (roads, high-speed trains, a Channel tunnel) to support cross-frontier trade and movement of people. A third major objective was to reduce unemployment by raising the level of labour skills, freeing up labour markets, and encouraging entrepreneurship. While "none of these ideas was particularly original...what was new was the pan-European approach."

In 1984, the ERT unveiled its "Missing Links" project to improve Europe's transborder ground transportation infrastructure. This included a proposal for a road/rail tunnel linking the UK and France, a Scandinavian road/rail link to northern Germany, and a European high-speed train system. The ERT supported the Oresund Bridge between Denmark and Sweden and the Fehmarn Belt Bridge.

Other issues addressed during the ERT's busiest decade, 1988 to 1998, included the environment, job creation, and taxation.

== Focus issues: Trade, EU enlargement, and monetary union ==
The ERT pushed hard for a world trade agreement during the Uruguay Round negotiations (from 1986 to 1993). Following Brexit, the group urged the UK to create a frictionless trade deal with the EU, and to provide clarity about the terms of Britain's exit. The ERT argued for the adoption of international accounting standards, and it took an early lead in the debate on carbon emissions.

The ERT supported the monetary union in the EU. It viewed monetary union as an essential component of the single market, and pursued the issue even while political leaders said it had little chance of success.

From early on, the ERT was in favour of the enlargement of the European Union. During the 1988 - 92 period it had a management training initiative in Eastern Europe following the dissolution of the Soviet Union.

== Assessment of ERT effectiveness ==
The Brussels Business is a 2013 documentary film by Friedrich Moser and Matthieu Lietaert on the influence of lobbyists and the lack of transparency of the European Union's decision-making processes. The ERT figures largely in the film as an organisation that has had the closest links with the EU.

A 1993 paper called Misshaping Europe provided the following assessment of the ERT:

Presenting a report under the name of the ERT seems to be the only way of getting the attention of the leaders of the EC (the European Community, as it then was). Time after time the ERT has succeeded in getting the EC to adopt the agenda of business at the expense of the environment, of labour and social concerns and genuine democratic participation.... The political agenda of the EC has to a large extent been dominated by the ERT......While the approximately 5000 lobbyists working in Brussels might occasionally succeed in changing details in directives, the ERT has in many cases been setting the agenda for and deciding the content of EC proposals."

The secretary general of the ERT from 1988 to 1998, Keith Richardson, responded to this criticism by noting that the lifeblood of the world economy comes from open markets and trade, and "In a world of six billion people it is inevitable that large organizations should form and play a leading role in both the public and private sectors". Richardson conceded, however, that perhaps the ERT had done "too well" in the 1990s, and that the ERT failed to effectively communicate its ideas in a way that reached beyond world leaders to the general public.

== Chairs ==
- 1983–1988: Pehr G. Gyllenhammar (Volvo)
- 1988–1992: Wisse Dekker (Philips)
- 1992–1996: Jérôme Monod (Suez Lyonnaise des Eaux)
- 1996–1999: Helmut Maucher (Nestlé)
- 1999–2001: Morris Tabaksblat (Reed Elsevier)
- 2001–2005: Gerhard Cromme (ThyssenKrupp)
- 2005–2009: Jorma Ollila (Nokia)
- 2009–2014: Leif Johansson (Ericsson)
- 2014–2018: Benoît Potier (Air Liquide)
- 2018–2022: Carl-Henric Svanberg (Volvo)
- 2022–present: Jean-François van Boxmeer (Vodafone)

(Source: ERT.eu)
