= SEPPIC =

French chemical company

Seppic
- Company type: Subsidiary of the Air Liquide group
- Industry: Chemicals
- Founded: 1943; 83 years ago
- Headquarters: La Garenne Colombes, France
- Products: Specialty chemical products for cosmetic, pharmaceutical, nutrition, vaccine and industrial markets
- Number of employees: 700 (2017)
- Parent: Air Liquide
- Website: www.seppic.com

Seppic is a French chemical company that designs and supplies specialty products for health and wellbeing. The company is based in France, with distributors and production sites around the world. It has four main areas of business: personal care, pharmaceuticals and nutrition, vaccine adjuvants and injectables, and industrial specialties.

Seppic has been part of the Air Liquide group since 1986. Its research has led to innovations in medical treatments, such as the creation of CimaVax, the first therapeutic vaccine to treat lung cancer.

== History ==
In 1943, French chemist André Bondouy founded SEPPIC (Société d’exploitation pour les produits de l’industrie chimique). Between 1946 and 1972, the company expanded, becoming the distributor for several other chemical manufacturers.

In 1972, under the leadership of Jean Martineau (then president of the Paris Chamber of Commerce), the company purchased Société des Produits Chimiques de la Montagne Noire in Castres, France. It created the MONTANE and Montanox product lines of emulsifiers, designed for the cosmetics, pharmaceutical and industrial markets.

In 1986, Seppic become a wholly owned subsidiary of Air Liquide as part of its healthcare business. In 1989, the company established its first American subsidiary in Fairfield, New Jersey.

In 2013, after the 2011 divestiture of a significant portion of its Industrial additives business, SEPPIC acquired BiotechMarine, a company specialized in Marine based cosmetic ingredients including plant stem cells.

In 2017, Seppic finalized the acquisition of Serdex, a specialist of botanical active ingredients for skin treatment.

== Research ==
Research conducted by Seppic teams has led to several innovations in the cosmetics and health sectors. The company now holds a portfolio of over 140 patent families.

In an early example of green chemistry in the 1990s, SEPPIC created Montanov 65, an emulsifier derived from matter of vegetable origin.

Later, it created SEPIGELTM 305, a pre-neutralized polymer in an inverse emulsion that enabled new textures, such as gel-creams.

In 2008, Seppic adjuvants were used to develop CimaVax, the first therapeutic vaccine to treat lung cancer.

== Partnerships ==
Seppic has research partnerships in the fields of health, nutrition, personal care, and vaccines with French and international companies, including the Japanese chemical giant Shin-Etsu. Seppic is also involved with the Cosmetic Valley business cluster.
