= The Brussels Business =

2012 documentary film

- Directed by: Matthieu Lietaert; Friedrich Moser
- Written by: Matthieu Lietaert; Friedrich Moser
- Produced by: Friedrich Moser; Steven Dhoedt
- Production company: Under the Milky Way
- Release date: 2012
- Running time: 85 minutes
- Countries: Austria; Belgium
- Language: English

The Brussels Business is a documentary film by Friedrich Moser and Matthieu Lietaert about the lack of transparency and the influence of lobbyists on the decision-making process in Brussels, the European Union capital. It also underlines the instrumental role of the European Roundtable of Industrialists in the making of the European Single Market as well as the construction of the European Services Forum, a core actor in the structuration of the service industry lobbying in Brussels. The film has been very popular in Brussels and Austria.

The Brussels Business is produced by Steven Dhoedt and Friedrich Moser.

== Prizes ==
- Best Pitch at The Bips (Best International Project Showcase) in the Crossmedia section at Sunny Side of the Doc 2010.

== See also ==
- European Round Table of Industrialists
