= Wisse Dekker =

Dutch businessman

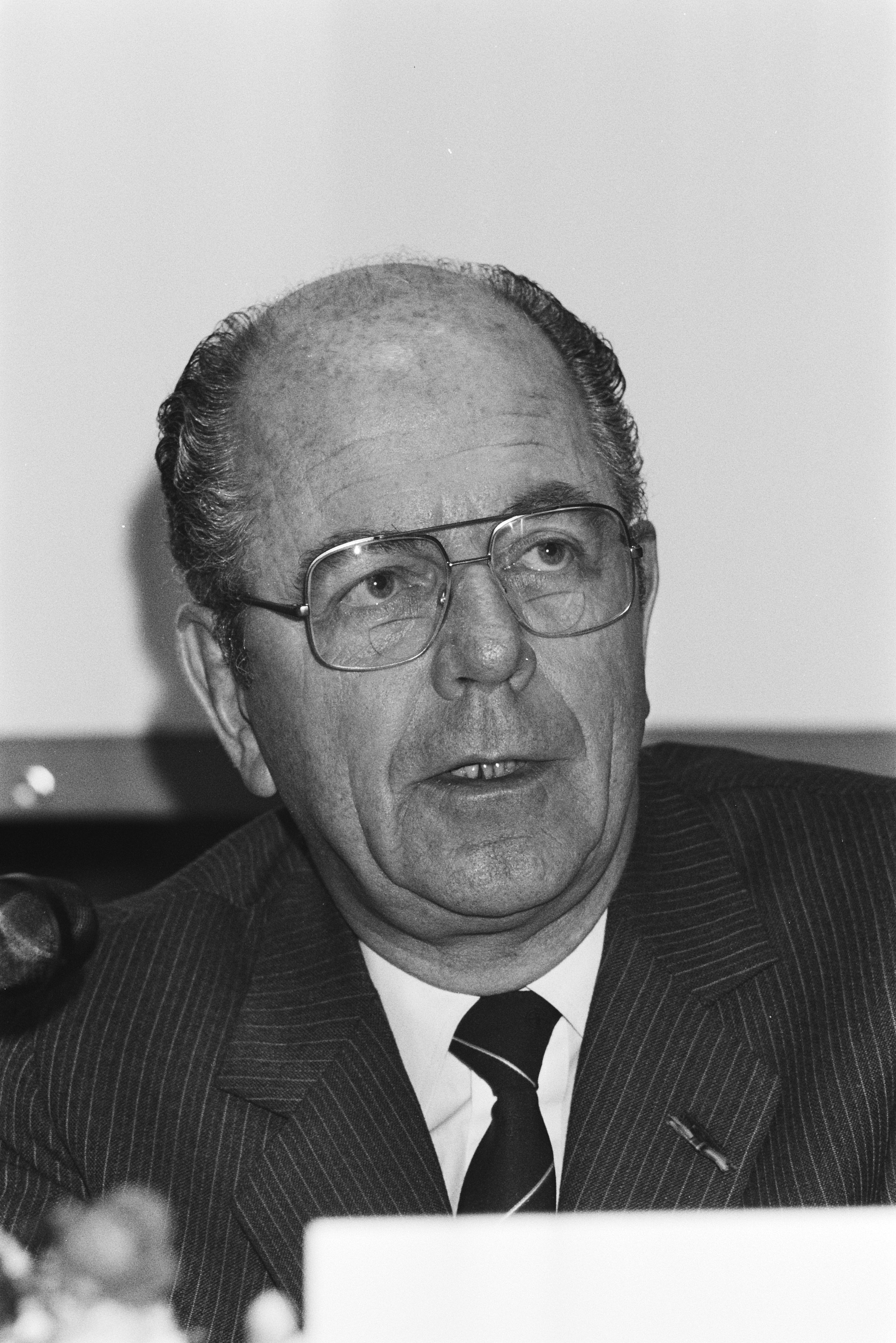
- Born: 26 April 1924; Eindhoven, North Brabant, Netherlands
- Died: 25 August 2012 (aged 88); Zoutelande, Zeeland, Netherlands
- Occupation: Businessman

Wisse Dekker (26 April 1924 – 25 August 2012) was a Dutch businessman. He was the CEO of Philips from 1982 to 1986. From 1988 until 1992 he was chairman of the European Round Table of Industrialists.
