= Benoît Potier =

French businessman (born 1957)

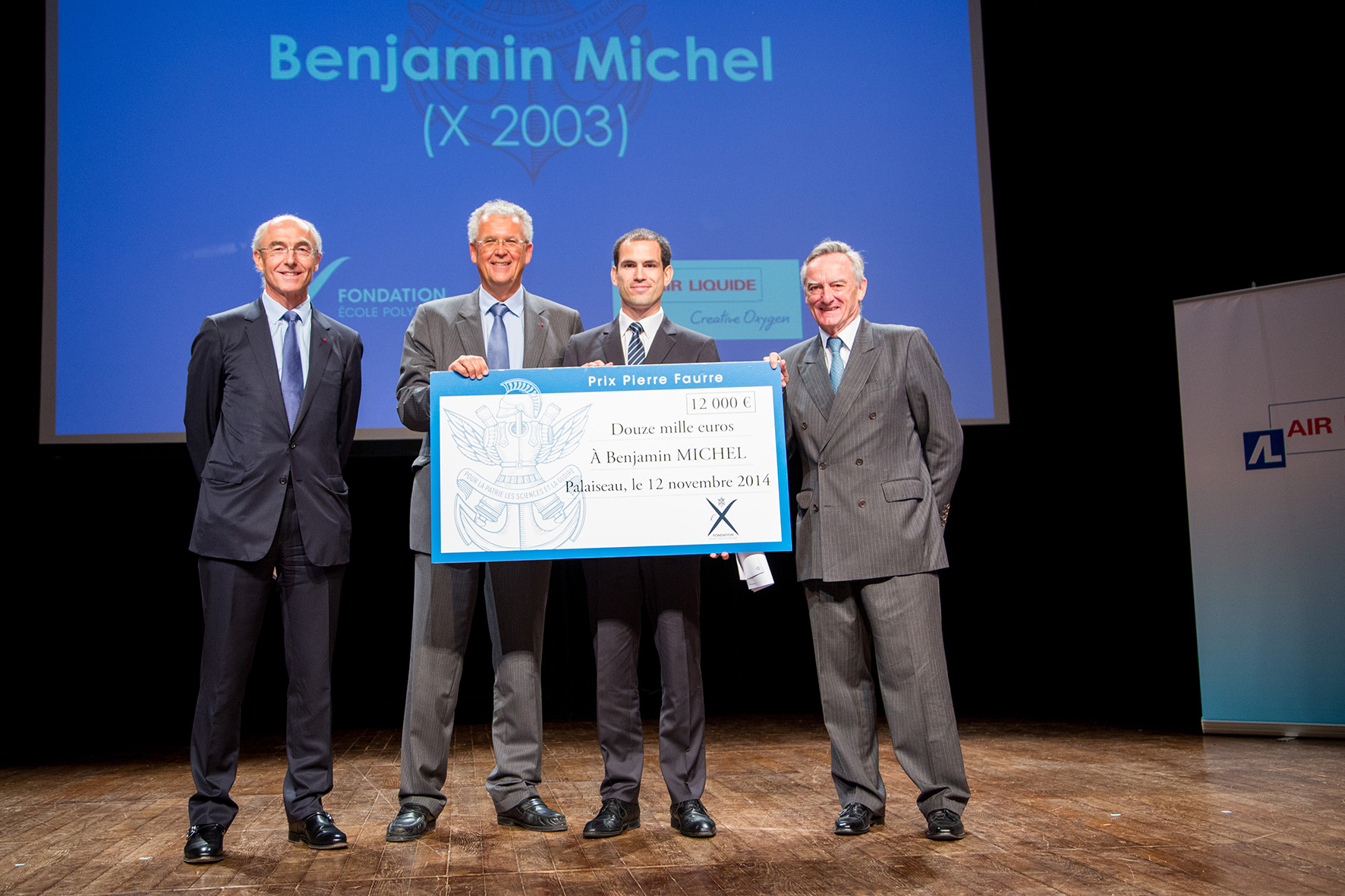
- Born: 3 September 1957 (age 69); Mulhouse, France
- Education: École Centrale Paris; INSEAD
- Occupation: Chairman of Air Liquide

Benoît Potier (French pronunciation: [bənwa potje]; born 3 September 1957) is a French businessman who was CEO of the French multinational industrial gas company Air Liquide from 2006 to 2022, and is now chairman.

== Education ==
Potier graduated with an engineer's degree from École Centrale Paris in 1979. Potier also attended the executive training program of the Wharton International Forum and the INSEAD Advanced Management program.

== Professional career ==
Potier joined Air Liquide in 1981 as a Research and Development engineer. After working as a Project Manager in the Engineering and Construction Division, he was made Vice-President of Energy Development in the Large Industries business line. In 1993, he became Director of Strategy & Organization and, in 1994, was put in charge of the Chemicals, Metal & Steel, Oil and Energy Markets. He was made an Executive Vice-President of Air Liquide in 1995 with additional responsibilities over the Engineering & Construction Division and the Large Industries operations in Europe. Benoît Potier was appointed Senior Executive Vice-President in 1997. He was appointed to the Board of Directors in 2000 and became Chairman of the Management Board in November 2001. Potier was chairman and chief executive officer of Air Liquide from 2006 to 2022. He has been holding the office of Chairman of the Board of Directors of Air Liquide since June 1, 2022.

== Other activities ==
=== Corporate boards ===
- Temasek Holdings, Member of the European Advisory Panel (since 2022)
- Siemens, Member of the Supervisory Board (since 2018)
- Unilever, Member of the Board (since 1 January 2025)

=== Non-profit organizations ===
- CentraleSupélec, Member of the Board
- Association Nationale des Societes par Actions (ANSA), Member of the Board
- Association Française des Entreprises Privées (AFEP), Member of the Board
- Cercle de l’Industrie, Member of the Board
- INSEAD, Member of the French Board
- La Fabrique de l’Industrie, Member of the Board
- European Roundtable of Industrialists (ERT), Vice-chairman

== Recognition ==
Potier has been awarded with France's Knight of the French Legion of honour "Chevalier de la Légion d'Honneur" and with the distinction of "Officier de l’Ordre du Mérite" in 2006.
