= Bull Gamma 10 =

Small business computer from the 1960s

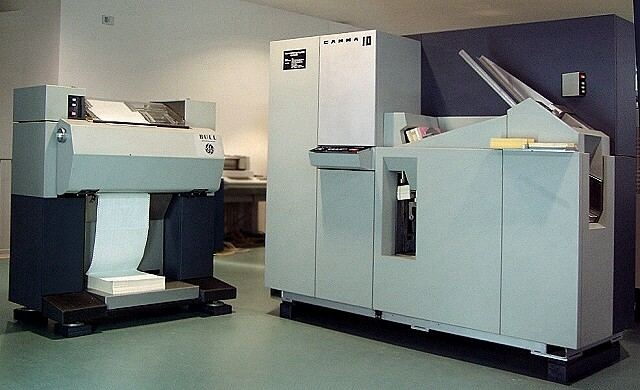
- Overview of a Bull Gamma 10, with the printer unit on the left
- Manufacturer: Compagnie des Machines Bull
- Type: Business computer
- Generation: Second generation
- Released: 1963
- Units sold: > 1400 (European market)
- CPU: Transistorized, about 570 DTL modules @ 7 µs memory cycle (140 kHz)
- Memory: 1K to 4K 7-bit characters (7 to 28 kb) (Core memory)
- Storage: Optional tape readers (1 MB tapes)
- Input: Punched cards
- Power: 2.4 kW
- Dimensions: 20 sq. meters
- Weight: 900kg
- Predecessor: Bull Gamma 3
- Successor: Bull Gamma 55

The Gamma 10 was a business computer designed and marketed by the Compagnie des Machines Bull starting in 1963.

Built as the successor to the Gamma 3 and as a response to the success of IBM's transistorized 1401, the Gamma 10 was a compact second-generation computer aimed at business use. Developed during a period of modernization at Bull under the influence of General Electric, it played a key role in the transition from punched card equipment to electronic data processing on the European market.

Widely adopted by small and medium-sized businesses across Europe during the 1960s, the Gamma 10 holds the distinction of being the first European computer to surpass 1,000 units sold.

== Description ==
The Gamma 10 used a hybrid technology based on germanium transistors, diodes, and electromechanical relays. Its modular architecture, typical of the 1960s, was built around interchangeable logic modules plugged into a backplane. Each module contained discrete components soldered onto printed circuit boards. The processor comprised around 570 of these modules, totaling approximately 5,000 transistors and 10,000 diodes. Over 2,500 test points were available throughout the system to assist with diagnostics.

Its magnetic core memory could store between 1,024 and 4,096 characters encoded on 7 bits, corresponding to an effective capacity of 7 to 28 kilo-bits. Programming was done in assembly language, referred to as “autocode” at Bull. The Gamma 10 featured a set of 56 instructions optimized for business tasks such as sorting, searching, field comparison, and file updating. Programs were loaded into memory from punched cards, and debugging, step-by-step execution, and register inspection were carried out via a control panel.

The Gamma 10 was equipped with a punched card reader-punch capable of processing around 300 cards per minute (5 cards per second), as well as a drum printer with a printing capacity of 5 lines per second. The system, particularly compact for its time, occupied approximately 20 square meters and consumed up to 2.5 kilowatts without requiring air conditioning, allowing it to be installed in standard office environments. This compactness was partly achieved by integrating the punched card reader—its main input/output peripheral—directly into the central unit. Bull entrusted the design to industrial designer Philippe Charbonneaux.

Starting in 1967, Bull added a magnetic tape drive as a storage peripheral. Each tape could store 1.2 million characters (about 8 Mb), and two drives could be connected to the Gamma 10.

The Gamma 10 also stood out for its ability to handle input/output operations in parallel, such as reading, computation, card punching, and printing.

== Commercial success and posterity ==
The Gamma 10 was one the best-selling computer of the 1960s on the European market. By the end of 1968, Bull had sold 1,412 units, including 644 in its home market, France, placing it ahead of its main competitors, the IBM 360/20 and the IBM 1401. Robust, affordable, and reputedly easy to program, the Gamma 10 remained popular among small businesses well into the 1970s.

It was succeeded by the Gamma 55 starting in 1967, although the Gamma 10 remained in the catalog for some time afterward. Like the Gamma 3, the Gamma 10 was not marketed in the United States, despite Bull being part of General Electric.

A working Gamma 10 is preserved at the Technikum29 museum in Germany, where it is regularly demonstrated to the public.

== Gallery ==
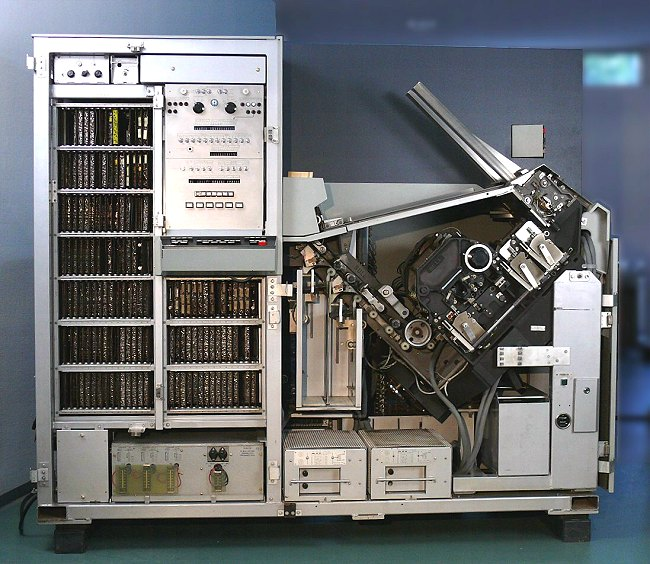
Front view of the Gamma 10 with its panel removed, showing the CPU and control panel on the left half

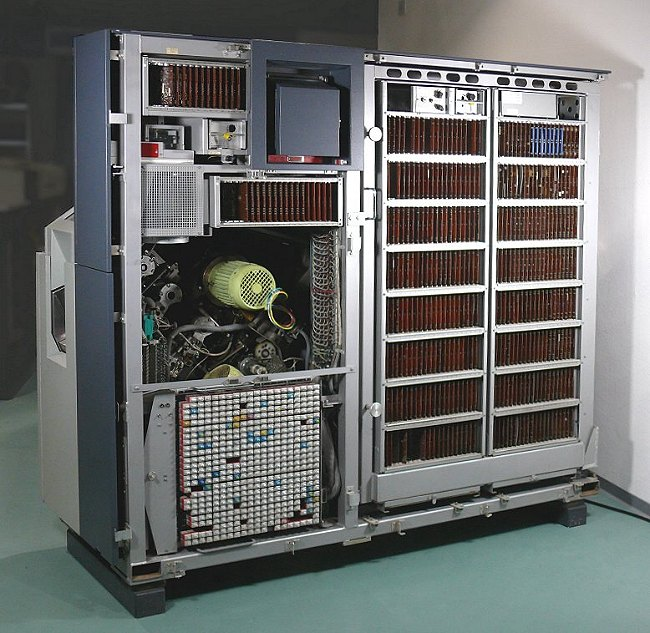
Back side of the Gamma 10 with its panel removed

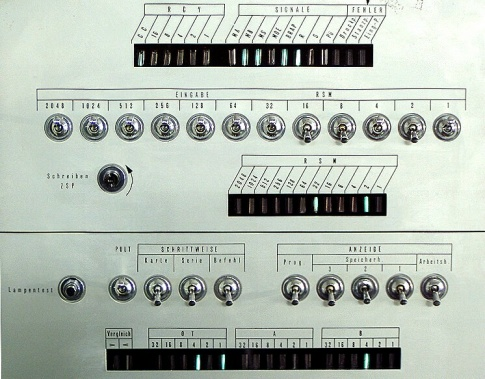
Detailed view of the operator control panel, with some indicators glowing green.

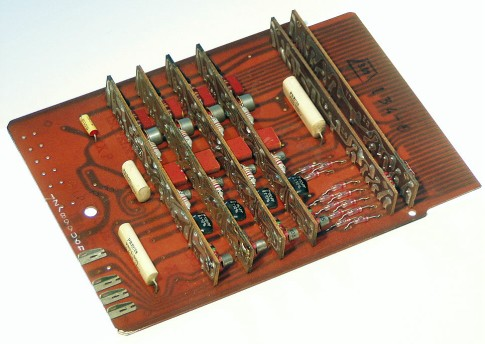
One of the CPU logic module
