= Air Liquide =

French industrial gas producer

Air Liquide S.A.

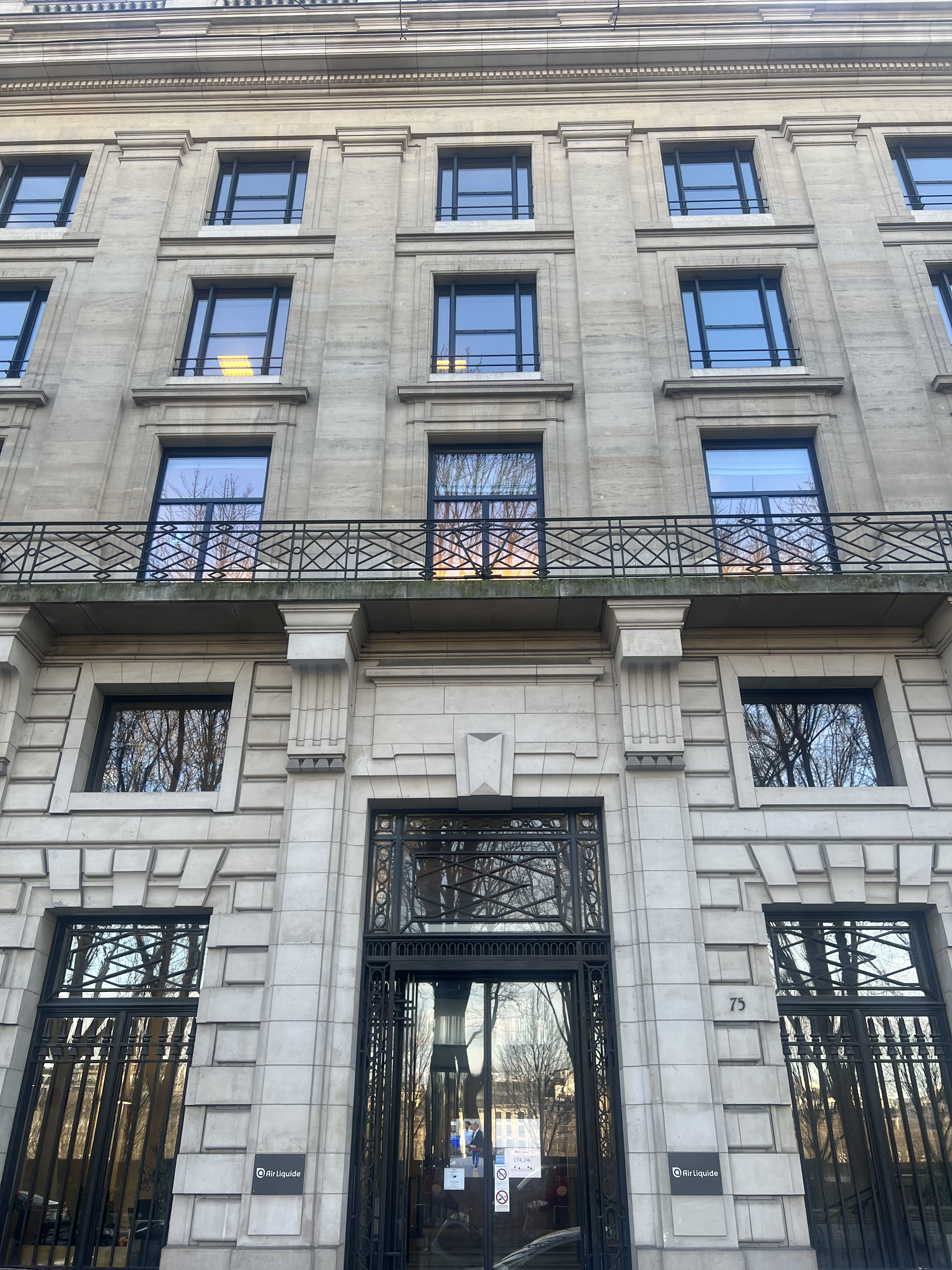
- Air Liquide headquarters in Paris
- Type: Société Anonyme
- Traded as: Euronext Paris: AI; CAC 40 component
- Industry: Chemicals, Health care, Engineering
- Predecessor: AG für Kohlensäure-Industrie; Air Liquide Austria
- Founded: 1902; 124 years ago
- Founder: Paul Delorme
- Headquarters: Quai d'Orsay, 7th arrondissement, Paris, France
- Key people: Benoît Potier (Chairman); François Jackow (CEO)
- Products: Industrial gases, fine chemicals
- Revenue: ▼€27 billion (2025)
- Operating income: ▲€5.58 billion (2025)
- Net income: ▲€3.64 billion (2025)
- Total assets: ▲€51.91 billion (2025)
- Total equity: ▼€26.21 billion (2025)
- Number of employees: 65,168 (2025)
- Website: www.airliquide.com

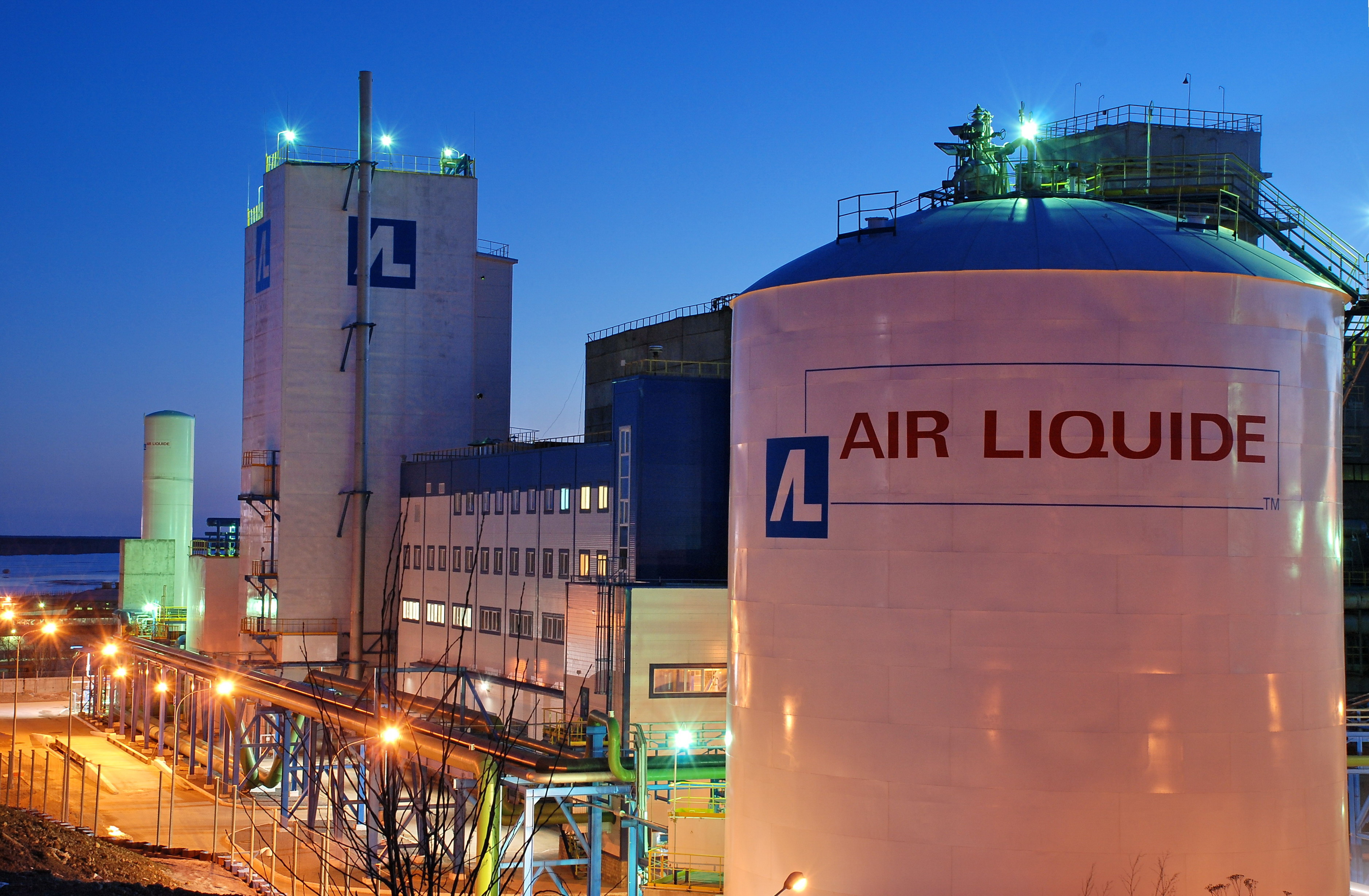
An Air Liquide industrial plant

Air Liquide S.A. (/ˌɛər lɪˈkiːd/ AIR lih-KEED, French: [ɛːʁ likid]; literally "liquid air") is a French multinational company which supplies industrial gases and services to various industries including medical, chemical and electronic manufacturers. Founded in 1902, Air Liquide is the second largest global supplier of industrial gases by revenues (after Linde plc) and has operations in over 70 countries.

The company's headquarters are in the 7th arrondissement of Paris. It also has major offices in Japan, Houston, Newark, Delaware, New Delhi, Frankfurt, Shanghai and Dubai. The company's research and development (R&D) targets the creation of industrial gases, and gases that are used in products such as healthcare items, electronic chips, foods, and chemicals.

== History ==
=== 1900–1930: Creation and introduction to the Paris Stock Exchange ===
On May 25, 1902, and after two years of research, Georges Claude developed a process for liquefying air in order to separate the components (oxygen, nitrogen, argon). On November 8, 1902, Paul Delorme gathered twenty-four subscribers, mainly engineers, to financially support the project, and became the first president of "Air liquide, a company for the study and exploitation of Georges Claude processes". The company originally had a capital of 100,000 francs.

In 1906, Air Liquide began operations in Belgium and Italy, followed by Canada, Japan and Hong Kong. On February 20, 1913, the company was listed on the Paris Stock Exchange.

=== 1930–1950: International development and innovations ===
By 1930, the company had grown considerably despite not taking on debt to fuel its expansion, to the extent that debt securities comprised only 15 percent of the company's overall resources. In 1938, Air Liquide acquired La oxígena S.A.and started operating in Argentina via the acquisition of the company La Oxígena.

In 1943, under the aegis of engineer Émile Gagnan (an employee of Air Liquide) and Lieutenant-Commander (ship-of-the-Line Lieutenant) Jacques-Yves Cousteau, Air Liquide manufactured scuba set prototypes that Cousteau and Frédéric Dumas used to shoot the underwater film Épaves (Shipwrecks), directed by Cousteau the same year. They were the first modern diving regulators.

In 1945, after the Second World War, Jean Delorme, the son of Paul Delorme and the second President of the Group, pursued renovation and the development of industrial tools. In 1946, Air Liquide founded La Spirotechnique, a design and marketing company for regulators and other diving equipment. That same year, La Spirotechnique launched the CG45, the first modern diving regulator to be marketed; this marked the beginning of the popularization of scuba diving.

=== 1950s: Large industries and Space research activities ===
In 1957, Air Liquide began its activity in the large industry and created networks of pipelines irrigating several large industrial basins in the world. In the 1960s, the company acquired American Cryogenics, as well as several other American companies. In 1962, Air Liquide launched its activities into the space industry.

In 1970, the company inaugurates the Claude-Delorme Research & Development Center, located in Les Loges-en-Josas (Yvelines) where over 250 researchers work in 35 laboratories, covering various research areas such as applied mathematics, clinical trials and process engineering. In March 2014, the group announced its intentions to expand and modernize the center.

In 1986, Air Liquide expanded into the United States with the acquisition of Big Three for $1.05 billion, a US-based company with operations in many countries across Europe and Asia. That same year, it acquired SEPPIC, a French specialty chemicals company, as part of its activities in the healthcare sector.

=== 1990–2010: Creation of Air Liquide Healthcare and acquisition strategy in the health sector ===
During the 2000s, Air Liquide increased its investments in hydrogen production plants. In 2001, Air Liquide acquired Messer Griesheim's operations in South Africa, Trinidad and Tobago, Canada, Egypt, Argentina and Brazil for €185 million. In September 2002, Air Liquide formed a Japanese-based joint venture with BOC under the name Japan Air Gases (JAG), which strengthened the group's presence in the Far East. In 2007, Air Liquide acquired the activities of Linde Gas in the United Kingdom, as well as the German engineering company, Lurgi, for €550 million.

=== Recent developments ===
In 2013, Air Liquide created ALIAD, a venture capital investor. The company was established the same year in the Air Liquide innovation laboratory in Paris, the i-Lab, launched in 2013 to support and share innovation across the Group. In November 2015, Air Liquide announced it would acquire the American firm Airgas for a total of $13.4 billion, including debt. The Airgas shareholders approved Air Liquide's acquisition on February 23, 2016. On May 23, 2016, Air Liquide announced the completion of the acquisition of Airgas.

In May 2017, Air Liquide announced the sale of Welding, its subsidiary of 2,000 employees to Lincoln Electric. In August of the same year, Air Liquide took control of Skagerak Naturgass AG, a subsidiary of Skagerak Energi, producer of biomethane for vehicles in Norway.

In February 2018, Air Liquide launched the world's largest oxygen production unit for Sasol. In September 2018, Air Liquide opened its Paris Innovation Campus, located on the "Plateau de Saclay", near Paris. The campus includes Air Liquide's largest Research & Development Center. On this occasion, Air Liquide announced the creation of a deep-tech start-up accelerator on the Innovation Campus by 2019.

In August 2025, in the context of Russia's invasion of Ukraine, a decree signed by Vladimir Putin placed Air Liquide's subsidiaries under "temporary management" of the Russian company M-Logistika. On August 22, 2025, Air Liquide agreed to buy South Korea’s DIG Airgas for an amount of 2.85 billion euros (then US$3.31 billion). This move was aimed to strengthen its market position in the country.

=== Incidents ===
An explosion occurred at a Air Liquide location in High Springs, Florida on May 4, 2023 The incident occurred at a site that creates specialty gas used to make computer chips. Four people were transported to local hospital, one of injured was airlifted.

== See also ==
- Fusion Industry Association
