= Miriam Weiner (genealogist) =

Jewish genealogist and columnist

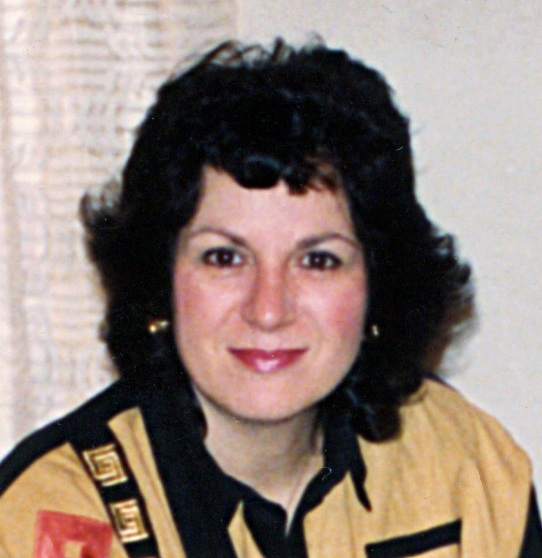
- Born: Los Angeles, California, U.S.
- Occupations: Genealogist; Author; Lecturer
- Years active: 1985–present
- Known for: Routes to Roots
- Notable work: Jewish Roots in Poland; Jewish Roots in Ukraine and Moldova
- Website: RoutesToRoots.com; RTRFoundation.org

Miriam Weiner (/ˈwiːnər/) is an American genealogist, author, and lecturer who specializes in the research of Jewish roots in Poland and the former Soviet Union. Weiner is considered to be one of the pioneers of contemporary Jewish genealogy through her work to open up archives and is described as a trail-blazing, highly respected guide and leading authority on archival holdings and resources in pre-war Belarus, Lithuania, Moldova, Poland, and Ukraine.

== Personal life ==
Weiner was born in Los Angeles, California, to Edward (who grew up in St. Louis, Missouri) and Helen Weiner (who grew up In Tulsa, Oklahoma). Weiner's parents were married in Los Angeles, California and both died in Florida. Weiner grew up in Des Moines, Iowa.

Weiner's family comes from Ukraine, Belarus, and Moldova. Her surname, Weiner, was originally Vinokur in Ukraine.

In 1960, Weiner graduated from Theodore Roosevelt High School in Des Moines. She attended the University of Oklahoma and Drake University in Des Moines. In 1986, she received a B.A. in Historical Studies with a concentration in Modern Judaic History and Holocaust Studies from Empire State College, SUNY.

Since 1986, Weiner has been based out of Secaucus, New Jersey. She also has an apartment in Mohyliv-Podilskyi, in southern Ukraine, which she uses as a base to conduct research.

== Career ==
=== Early career ===
After attending college, Weiner moved to Southern California and worked for the Orange County Sheriff's Department in Santa Ana, California. During this time, she also took courses in criminal justice at Orange Coast College.

From 1969 to 1971, she was country singer Bobbie Gentry's assistant and road manager. She got the job by answering an advertisement in the newspaper.

Weiner worked as a paralegal for various attorneys in Beverly Hills, California. Weiner was then licensed as a private investigator by the State of California, which she said helped her later in her “next life” as a genealogist. Weiner moved to Northern California and lived on a horse ranch and worked as a real estate agent. In 1984, Weiner moved to Albany, New York, where her mother was born and many family members still lived, while she finished her college degree.

=== Genealogy ===
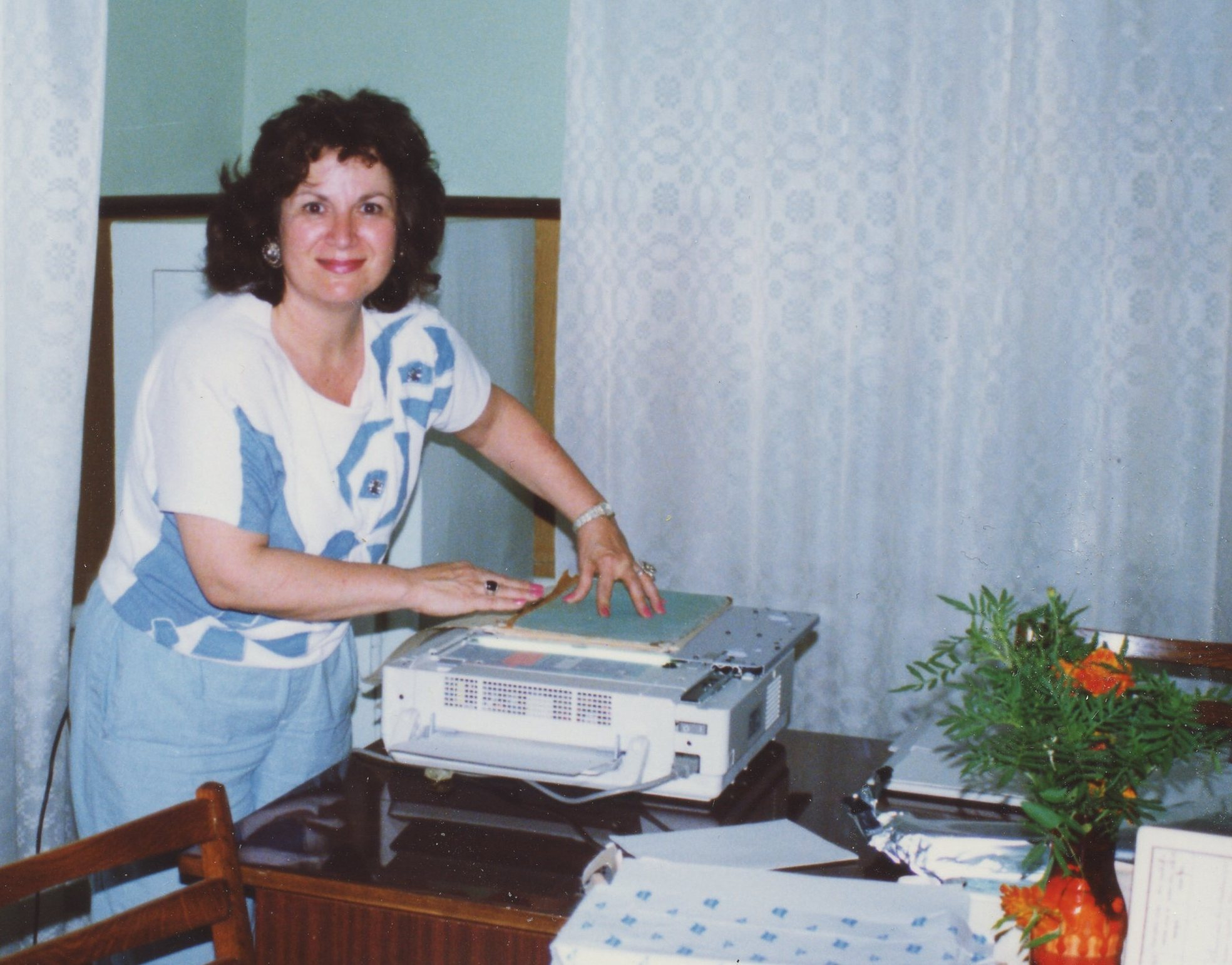
Weiner makes photo copy of her grandmother's birth record located in the Priluki Town Hall, Ukraine, 1991

In 1985, with the recommendation of Rabbi Malcolm H. Stern, genealogist for the American Jewish Archives in Cincinnati, Ohio, and Fellow of the American Society of Genealogists, Weiner became the first Jewish genealogist to be certified by the Board for Certification of Genealogists in Washington, D.C. As part of the ongoing certification process, the Board for Certification of Genealogists has required intensive review and continuing education, resulting in separate renewals (every 5 years) of Weiner's genealogical work over 30+ years. In 2015, the Board for Certification of Genealogists awarded Miriam "Emeritus" status based upon a "long and distinguished career with BCG." Noted rabbi, historican, and genealogist Malcolm H. Stern, considered her "the most valuable person in the field of genealogy" and a standard bearer of all that BCG upholds."

From 1986 to 1988, Weiner was executive director of the American Gathering of Jewish Holocaust Survivors (AGJHS) in New York City, which was founded by Benjamin Meed. Amongst her duties, Weiner helped develop the database of Holocaust survivors, now known as the Benjamin and Vladka Meed Registry of Holocaust Survivors, that is now housed at the United States Holocaust Memorial.

From 1987 to 1996, Weiner was a syndicated columnist, writing the column "Roots and Branches", which was published in more than 100 Jewish newspapers and periodicals, both domestically and internationally. Some of Weiner's articles were published in "Together" (a periodical published by the American Gathering of Jewish Holocaust Survivors).

In 1988, inspired by reconnecting with her extended maternal family from Albany at a funeral, Weiner expanded the research of her family's roots with a renewed focus on Eastern Europe. This was before the 1991 dissolution of the Soviet Union, when it was virtually impossible to obtain access to archives for genealogical purposes in that part of the world. In 1989, as a result of the genealogy research and outreach from Weiner's syndicated column, "Roots and Branches", the Polish National Tourist Office (PNTO) extended an invitation for Weiner to visit Poland for the purpose of meeting with the head archivists and also to make plans for subsequent Jewish tour groups to visit their ancestral towns in Poland. Weiner found that the perception that Jewish documents were completely destroyed during World War II by the occupation of Nazi and Soviet governments was untrue. Weiner gained permission from the head archivist in Poland to create a town-by-town index to surviving Jewish and civil documents in archives throughout Poland. She did this with the official cooperation of the Polish State Archives.

Also in 1988, an agreement was signed between the Museum of Jewish Heritage (MJH) in New York City and Miriam Weiner wherein Weiner would serve as a paid consultant to the Museum's Learning Center. This work later evolved into Weiner's work with the Ukraine Archives and how the MJH could also collaborate with the Ukraine Archives via bringing an exhibition to the U.S. and publishing a catalog in cooperation with the Archives.

=== Routes to Roots ===
In 1990, Weiner founded the company, Routes to Roots, which offered archival research services to individuals throughout the world. Through Routes to Roots, Weiner organized customized tours to ancestral towns for individuals and groups interested in Poland and the former Soviet Union, including Ukraine, Moldova, Belarus, Lithuania, and Poland. Weiner undertook these tours of ancestral towns at a time when there was little to no technology, and difficulties specific to Jewish genealogy included the lack of surnames until the late 1700s, the fluidity of surnames due to immigration and language, and the destruction of documents during The Holocaust. Through Routes to Roots, Weiner has conducted genealogical research in the archives of Poland and the former Soviet Union.

=== Routes to Roots Foundation ===
In 1994, Weiner founded the Routes to Roots Foundation, a nonprofit organization. The Routes to Roots Foundation hosts a website which includes a town-by-town index and inventory of surviving Jewish and civil documents held at archives and institutions in Eastern Europe, Israel and the United States Holocaust Memorial Museum in Washington, D.C. The website includes articles by archivists, historians and scholars; maps; document examples; name lists for about a dozen towns; as well as other reference material. Much of this information now available online was originally published in two books by the Routes to Roots Foundation, although the books include additional detailed content and images. As part of the activities of the Routes to Roots Foundation, Weiner donated copies of the books to the individual archives in Poland, Ukraine, and Moldova in appreciation of their assistance and as a way to improve the discoverability of their holdings relating to Jewish genealogical sources. Weiner also donated copies of the books to Jewish genealogical organizations.

==== Jewish Roots in Poland ====
In 1997, in official cooperation with the Polish State Archives (Naczelna Dyrekcja Archiwów Państwowych in Warsaw, Poland), Weiner authored and published the book, Jewish Roots in Poland. The book includes archival holdings of the Polish State Archives, the Jewish Historical Institute in Warsaw, local town hall documents throughout Poland, Holocaust documents found in the archives of the death camps located in Auschwitz near Kraków and Majdanek near Lublin. The book also features document examples, maps, antique postcards depicting towns and daily life, and modern-day photographs. There are individual town listings for localities with more than 10,000 Jews in 1939. Zachary M. Baker, Head Librarian of the YIVO Institute for Jewish Research stated, "This book is a testimony to its author's resourcefulness, years of hard work, persistence, and meticulous attention to detail. She has skillfully identified and addressed several gaps in Jewish genealogical and family historical literature. Jewish Roots in Poland provides the means for researchers to go out and "do it themselves," through its extensive chapters on Polish Jewish communities, on Polish state, municipal, and concentration camp archives and on the Jewish Historical Institute; and through its exhaustive bibliographies, abundant photographs, maps and lists of addresses. These features, taken together, promise to make this a very successful reference book."

This book received high praise from fellow authors including:

- Chaim Potok (author of The Chosen) who said: "Miriam Weiner has produced a monumental work of research into primary sources on pre- and post-World War II Polish Jewry. In a volume replete with pictorial and map material, she not only provides the scholar with hitherto undiscovered data, she also offers rich material to those who wish to engage in private quests for family origins."
- Leon Uris (author of Exodus) who said: "For centuries, Poland was the hearthstone of the Jewish religion and culture. The Holocaust, mostly on Polish soil, nearly obliterated this great community. Miriam Weiner, through her vital book, Jewish Roots in Poland, has given credence to the proposition that a civilization gone and its people destroyed, will never be forgotten. Ms. Weiner has painstakingly reconstructed Jewish Poland, town by town, unearthing documents and haunting archives. With hundreds of color photographs, this book is an extremely important one and a must book for every Jewish library."
- Elie Wiesel (author of Night) who said: "This impressive reference book is of great importance to all those wishing to discover the Jewish past."

==== Jewish Roots in Ukraine and Moldova ====
In a recent interview with Weiner, Tasha Ackerman commented,"Miriam's work hasn’t been just about extracting documents; it’s been about building trust and forming relationships with archivists who were often skeptical and who sometimes took a risk in order to help Miriam on her mission. When she began her trips to Ukraine, Miriam faced the enormous challenge of not speaking the language while attempting something unprecedented in her field. In the early years of her work, particularly when visiting small villages, she knew she might be the first American that many archivists and residents had ever encountered. Compensating for her lack of Ukrainian language skills, she arrived with big smiles and hugs." In 1999, in official cooperation with the Ukraine State Archives (Ukraïnskyi derzhavnyi arkhiv) and the Moldova National Archives (Arhivă Naţională a Republicii Moldova), Weiner authored and published Jewish Roots in Ukraine and Moldova. The book includes archival holdings of the Ukraine State Archives and its branch archives throughout the country and the Moldova National Archives in Chișinău as well as local town hall documents throughout Ukraine and Moldova. The book also features document examples, maps, antique postcards depicting towns and daily life, and modern-day photographs. There are individual town listings for localities throughout both countries.

This book received high praise from fellow authors including:

- Dr. Michael Berenbaum (one of the world’s pre-eminent Holocaust scholars, authors and former Project Director of the United States Holocaust Memorial Museum), provides the Foreword for the book, saying: "Miriam Weiner's painstaking work, Jewish Roots in Ukraine and Moldova, like her earlier work, Jewish Roots in Poland, is most valuable. She has initiated and made available to the public for the first time, in a concise and readable form, the inventories of records relating to the Jewish experience in these countries that are held in their archives. She has taken us through these archives and offered us a peek at their treasures. She has empowered fellow pilgrims -- scholar and novices alike -- to begin their own search, to commence their own journey. These efforts must be celebrated. Miriam was brave and bold, persistent, disciplined and demanding. She has opened to us an entire world for exploration and has saved all of us, even the most informed, months of effort and false starts. She has made a daunting task appear ever more possible, even more beckoning. This book is not Miriam's first contribution to memory, but it must surely rank among her finest."
- Chaim Potok (American author, novelist, playwright, editor, rabbi and author of The Chosen) who said: "Miriam Weiner's Jewish Roots in Ukraine and Moldova is an invaluable source book replete with photographs, documents and archival inventories of a world that should be of vital interest to all who treasure the past and want to keep vivid our memories of it."
- Leon Uris (American author of historical fiction who wrote many bestselling books, including Exodus and Trinity) who said: "Miriam Weiner, a courageous and brilliant historian and archivist, has haunted the archives of Eastern Europe, painstakingly piercing together the world that was. Here she has memorialized hundreds of shtetls and towns through document examples and photographs. Her earlier book on Polish Jewry alerted us to the fact that she was equal to the task. Jewish Roots in Ukraine and Moldova is part of a masterwork of love and remembrance, so important to me and my children."

==== Belarus and Lithuania ====
The Routes to Roots Foundation website also includes articles by archivists and historians, maps and archive data from Belarus and Lithuania, presented in a similar format as Weiner's two books. Originally envisioned as a third book in the Jewish Roots series, this information is only found online.

==== Routes to Roots Foundation Website Databases ====
Archive Database

An online Archive Database containing detailed information about archives listed in Weiner's books on Poland, Ukraine, and Moldova was published in 2002 on the Routes to Roots Foundation website. The Archive Database was then supplemented with similar data from Belarus, Lithuania, and selected archives in Romania. The database continues to be updated by Weiner.

Image Database

A drop-down menu of 2,141 images (antique postcard views from the 1920s and before; Synagogue and Jewish cemetery photos from around the world, Holocaust memorials and other town views) of 358 towns in six countries in Eastern Europe.

Surname Databases

Standard Surname Search (surname lists, archive documents, books) and OCR Surname Search (telephone books and business directories).

Holocaust Lists

A new database which includes known Holocaust Collections from select towns in Belarus, Lithuania, Moldova, Poland and Ukraine. Choose the town from the drop-down menu. Typical entry example: Town: Pruzhany District (Belarus); documents in Brest Oblast Archives; entry: 1944-1945 (PARTIAL LISTS OF DISTRICT RESIDENTS SHOT OR HANGED BY THE GERMAN OCCUPIERS; LISTS OF PERSONS DEPORTED TO GERMANY).

Maps

- JOG Maps (Joint Operations Graphic) - The JOG Maps are regional maps for cities, towns and villages throughout Belarus, Poland, Lithuania, Moldova and Ukraine. The original paper maps were scaled at 1:250,000 including names and details of even small villages, plus roads and railways, rivers and lakes, and wooded areas. Borders between administrative districts in effect at the time are also marked. Topography is indicated by color bands and contour lines.
- Soviet Town Plans - The Soviet Town Plans are full-color maps of selected major cities and towns in Belarus, Lithuania, Moldova, Poland, Romania and Ukraine, produced in the 1970s-80s. The maps are printed at 1:10,000 scale generally, clearly showing the footprints of individual buildings and other man-made and natural features, with topographic contours. Many maps include multiple sheets and full street name indexes. In Russian language and place name conventions.
- Individual Town & Region Maps - Individual Town & Region Maps are both black & white and color maps for major cities and smaller towns in Belarus, Lithuania, Moldova, Poland, Romania and Ukraine, produced primarily in the 1980s-2010. Many of these maps were produced by the local town architect; others came from various historians and archivists in the relevant countries.

=== Additional work ===
Weiner is a former Advisory Board Member of the American Red Cross organization, Holocaust and War Victims Tracing and Information Center. Weiner lectures and gives workshops and has presented her research at Jewish genealogy organizations and events, both domestically and internationally.

==== Encyclopedia of Jewish Genealogy ====
In 1989, Weiner began a collaboration with Arthur Kurzweil wherein they were co-editors of The Encyclopedia of JewishGenealogy (EJG), published in 1991. In his Acknowledgements in the EJG, Kurzweil wrote: "It is my sincere hope that those who use this Encyclopedia will know that it would not exist without the countless hours of work as well as the remarkable resourcefulness of Miriam Weiner. Miriam is a major force in the world of Jewish family history and genealogy. Her passion for the subject is inspirational, her knowledge is truly encyclopedic, and her skills are many and impressive. Through her lectures, classes, newspaper columns, magazine articles, publications and activities, Miriam has enriched and elevated the field of Jewish genealogy. She has assisted great numbers of people and is a generous soul, with a deep and profound love for the Jewish people."

- Rabbi Malcolm H. Stern (genealogist, American Jewish Archives") wrote, "with The Encyclopedia, Jewish genealogy comes of age as a recognizable science. These volumes are basic to any research in this field. One is amazed at the wealth of detail contained in these 226 pages. For my native Philadelphia where I have researched for many years, I found resources I have never used because I was unaware of their holdings until I read them here."
- Bernard Wax (director of American Jewish Historical Society), said, "The Encyclopedia of Jewish Genealogy is an answer to the prayers of both Jewish genealogists and historians. The volumes provide a unique and complete view of the diversity of research possibilities and resources that are available. Both Kurzweil and Weiner serve the reader very well indeed."
- Ernest W. Michel (Chairman World Gathering of Jewish Holocaust Survivors 1981 & Executive Vice-President United Jewish Appeal Federation of Jewish Philanthropies, New York), wrote, "The Encyclopedia of Jewish Genealogy is a unique contribution to the history of the Holocaust. The special section on Holocaust research will assist survivors and their children in the process of uncovering what happened to their families, where and how they died, and most importantly, how they lived. The survivor community owes a great deal of gratitude to the experts in Jewish genealogical research. I only hope that survivors will take advantage of this opportunity and transmit to their children the story of what happened to us. This is the only way we can ensure the memory of what was to future generations."

== Legacy ==
Weiner has been described as "the Indiana Jones of prewar Polish Jewry." Weiner has discovered previously unknown archival holdings and then had this information translated and made available to the public via her books and website; in so doing, she has been described as “the genealogist who lifted the archival iron curtain.”

Following Weiner's first visit to Ukraine in April 1991, she wrote a lengthy article describing her experiences in visiting numerous towns and archives throughout the country. In her article that was published in Chai Today, she wrote, "One of the major problems with locating Jewish records in Ukraine and throughout Eastern Europe, is that no one is really sure what exists and where. During the Holocaust, documents were sometimes moved to strange places for safekeeping and never returned to the proper repository."

Weiner changed the perception that there were no Jewish ancestral documents available after The Holocaust. Because of her early travels to Eastern Europe, beginning in Poland in 1989 and Ukraine in 1990, and the time she spent working in the archives there, Weiner was able to debunk the myth that existed at that time, an assumption that all Jewish documents were destroyed during the Holocaust. With her column “Roots and Branches” and along with her lecture schedule, she made this discovery available and accessible to Jews throughout the world. In addition to finding that documents had survived, Weiner organized the information, pre-internet, so that it was easier for genealogists researching their families to find information about archives, museums, and libraries with family documents. The original data in the archives needed to be translated, coded by document type and manually entered into an organized format. The result was the Archive Database created by Weiner, which then became available to the public in her two books and via the Routes to Roots Foundation website.

In June 2000, Weiner was interviewed by Emmy-Award winning anchor Steve Adubato for a New Jersey PBS broadcast of the show One-on-One which features in-depth interviews with today's most interesting people who do extraordinary things. In the interview's opening segment, Adubato told the audience: "Miriam's books mean an awful lot to a whole lot of people who want to connect the past to who they are today. So many people don't have that connection and that is exactly what Miriam does with an extraordinary amount of research."

=== Donations of genealogical and archival material ===
Weiner has donated collected materials and organized research to various archives, institutions and organizations. The items include books, maps, town brochures, video cassettes, archive inventories, and document copies. Listed below are societies and organizations that have received donations of genealogical and archival material from Weiner:

- American Sephardi Federation
- Association of Holocaust Organizations
- Association of Jewish Libraries
- Center for Jewish History's Ackman & Ziff Family Genealogy Institute
- Center for Jewish History Collections
- Central State Historical Archives of Ukraine in Kyiv
- Chernivtsy Regional Welfare Fund In Chernivtsy, Ukraine
- Hebrew Immigrant Aid Society
- Jewish Genealogy Society of Greater Philadelphia
- JewishGen Bessarabia/Moldova SIG Group
- JewishGen Belarus SIG Group
- Jewish Historical Institute, Warsaw, Poland
- JRI-Poland
- Judaica Foundation - Center For Jewish Culture in Kraków, Poland
- Latvian State Historical Archives (Latvijas Valsts Vēstures Arhīvs) in Riga, Latvia
- Library of Congress
- Lithuanian State Archives (Lietuvos Archyvų Departamentas) in Vilnius, Lithuania
- Russian American Jewish Experience
- St. Louis County Library
- Vernadsky National Library of Ukraine in Kyiv, Ukraine
- Yeshiva University and Yeshiva University's Sephardic Reference Room
- YIVO Institute for Jewish Research

=== Partnership agreements ===
In 2009, the Miriam Weiner Routes to Roots Foundation, Inc. and The Generations Network, Inc. now known as Ancestry.com entered into a partnership agreement that granted Ancestry.com a semi-exclusive right and limited license to display the Archive Database and 1,200 images on the Ancestry.com website.

In April 2012, Weiner entered into a partnership with the Center for Jewish History in New York City, donating data from the Routes to Roots Foundation Eastern European Archival Database and Image Database for integration into the Center for Jewish History's online catalog. Weiner also became the Senior Advisor for Genealogy Services for the Ackman & Ziff Family Genealogy Institute at the Center for Jewish History.

In 2016, Weiner entered into partnerships with two JewishGen Special Interest Groups (SIGs) for Belarus and Bessarabia which involved the donation of research materials so it is available on each group's website.

Later that same year, Weiner entered into an agreement with the Library of Congress where she donated 95 volumes of telephone books for cities, towns and villages in Belarus, Moldova and Ukraine. After acquiring digital rights from Moldova, several of their telephone books were scanned are now accessible at the Library of Congress website via a surname search, as well as the RTRF website. Weiner's 90+ telephone book collection from cities and town in Ukraine were also scanned are now available at the Library of Congress website in a keyword searchable format.

Additionally, in that same year, Weiner entered into a license agreement with JRI-Poland where Weiner and the Routes to Roots Foundation will contribute extensive archive data, articles, name lists, and other reference material to be processed by JRI-Poland and placed on its website.

In 2018, Weiner entered into a partnership agreement with JewishGen and the Museum of Jewish Heritage: A Living Memorial to the Holocaust in New York City, wherein Weiner and the Routes to Roots Foundation contributed extensive material from Belarus and Moldova including archive inventories, archive documents, articles, name lists, maps, images, and other reference material that were subsequently placed on the JewishGen website.

Tulsa, Oklahoma:

"At the annual membership meeting of The Sherwin Miller Museum of Jewish Art (SMMJA) on May 13, 2026, it was announced that a massive genealogy collection and archival material spanning five decades will be donated to the Museum by internationally renowned Jewish genealogist, Miriam Weiner. Miriam has been called "A Rock Star in the Jewish Genealogy World;" "The Genealogist Who Lifted the Archival Iron Curtain;" and "The First Lady of Jewish Genealogy." …..

One of the most important archives of Jewish genealogy in the World, The Miriam Weiner Jewish Genealogy Collection consists of books, town & region maps (some 200 years old), ancestral town videos, photographs, paintings (Judaic & Holocaust themed), published articles, antique postcards, archive inventories (from six countries in Eastern Europe and Israel, Central Archives for the History of the Jewish People/CAHJP at National Library of Israel), U.S. Holocaust & Memorial Museum; document copies and various items of Judaica, all connected to archives and towns in Eastern Europe.

Eventually, Miriam's website (rtrfoundation.org) will also become part of the Collection and the website will be hosted by the Museum. Some of her surname lists and document copies are not elsewhere or online and will be searchable by surname as well as by ancestral town name. From a Jewish genealogical standpoint, this is a historic and monumental contribution, unique unto itself. ….
The current library within the SMMJA will be renovated and remodeled to accommodate the Weiner Collection. According to Tracey Herst-Woods, Deputy Director of the SMMJA and Chief Museum Officer, "The Museum is humbled and grateful for Miriam's life's work to make the SMMJA its home. The work now starts to create a space that is worthy of her collection." An official opening of the Collection for the entire Jewish Community will be announced at a future date."

== Awards ==
Weiner has been referred to as “A Rock Star in the Jewish Genealogy World,” "The Genealogist Who lifted the Archival Iron Curtain,” and “The First Lady of Jewish Genealogy.”

- 1988: Council of Genealogy Columnists, General Writing, Special Interest Writing Award
- 1990: The Lidman Prize Competition, Writing Award for "A Window Into the Past" in Outlook (Honorable Mention)
- 1991: Council of Genealogical Columnists, Writing Award
- 1991: Federation of Genealogical Societies, Distinguished Work in Genealogy & History
- 1991: National Genealogical Society, Individual Achievement
- 1999: International Association of Jewish Genealogical Societies, Outstanding Contribution via Print Award: Miriam Weiner for Jewish Roots in Poland
- 1999: Jewish Book Council, National Jewish Book Award, Reference (Finalist) for Jewish Roots in Ukraine and Moldova
- 2000: Neographics, Best of Category: Reference Books/Directories to Routes to Roots Foundation
- 2000: Association of Jewish Libraries, AJL Research and Special Libraries Division Reference Award for Jewish Roots in Ukraine and Moldova
- 2000: International Association of Jewish Genealogical Societies, Outstanding Contribution to Jewish Genealogy via Print for Jewish Roots in Ukraine and Moldova
- 2003: International Association of Jewish Genealogical Societies, Lifetime Achievement Award
- 2015: Board for Certification of Genealogists, Awarded Emeritus status
- 2017: Jewish Women's Archive Award, honored with Profile entry.
- 2019: National Genealogical Society, honored with the President's Citation.
- 2020: Federation of Genealogical Societies, honored with the Rabbi Malcolm H. Stern Humanitarian Award.
- 2020-2025: Family Tree Magazine, Best Genealogy Websites, by David Fryxell.
- 2023: National Genealogical Society, honored with the Genealogy in Tourism Award
- 2024: International Association of Jewish Genealogical Societies, Outstanding Project/Resource/Program Award (RTRF Website)
- 2024: Massachusetts Genealogical Council, Shirley M. Barnes Records Access Award

== Works and publications ==
- Weiner, Miriam (December 1990). "Can You Name Your Eight Great-Grandparents?: Exploring Your Jewish Roots Leads to a Link with the Past." Moment Magazine, Washington DC. Vol. 15, no. 6.
- Kurzweil, Arthur; Weiner, Miriam, eds. (1991). The Encyclopedia of Jewish Genealogy. Northvale, NJ: J. Aronson. ISBN 978-0-87-668835-9. OCLC 609144865.
- Weiner, Miriam (1992). "Genealogy". In Fischel, Jack; Pinsker, Sanford (eds.). Jewish-American History and Culture: An Encyclopedia. New York: Garland. pp. 198–206. ISBN 978-0-82-406622-2. OCLC 23654269.
- Weiner, Miriam; Polish State Archives (in cooperation with) (1997). Jewish Roots in Poland: Pages from the Past and Archival Inventories. Secaucus, NJ: Miriam Weiner Routes to Roots Foundation. ISBN 978-0-96-565080-9. OCLC 38756480.
- Weiner, Miriam; Ukrainian State Archives (in cooperation with); Moldovan National Archives (in cooperation with) (1999). Jewish Roots in Ukraine and Moldova: Pages from the Past and Archival Inventories. Secaucus, NJ: Miriam Weiner Routes to Roots Foundation. ISBN 978-0-96-565081-6. OCLC 607423469.
- Weiner, CG, Miriam (Fall 2001). "Eastern European Archival Database Planned". Avotaynu. XVII (3): 1–2.
- Weiner, Miriam (2003). "Genealogical Resources in Ukraine" (PDF). In Sack, Sallyann Amdur; Mokotoff, Gary (eds.). Avotaynu Guide to Jewish Genealogy. Bergenfield, NJ: Avotaynu, Inc. ISBN 978-1-88-622316-5. OCLC 53254059.
- Weiner, Miriam (2007). "International Association of Jewish Genealogical Societies" (PDF). In Skolnik, Fred (ed.). Encyclopaedia Judaica (2nd ed.). Farmington Hills, MI: Thomson Gale. pp. 810–811. ISBN 978-0-02-866097-4.
- Weiner, Miriam (2008). "Archives". In Hundert, Gershon David (ed.). The YIVO Encyclopedia of Jews in Eastern Europe. New Haven, CT: Yale University Press. ISBN 978-0-30-011903-9. OCLC 608616449.

Selected syndicated columns

- Weiner, Miriam, May 1987, Jewish Genealogy "By the Book"
- Weiner, Miriam, September 1987, Glasnost and Genealogy
- Weiner, Miriam, October 11, 1987, Roots and Branches
- Weiner, Miriam, April 8, 1988, Yad Vashem Affirms Deaths
- Weiner, Miriam, May 1988, Digging Roots in a Dictionary
- Weiner, Miriam, August 4, 1988, Passing on a Legacy of Love to the Next Generation
- Weiner, Miriam, November 1988, The Other Ellis Island
- Weiner, Miriam, December 1988, Is This My Dad?
- Weiner, Miriam, January 1989, Ships of our Ancestors
- Weiner, C.G., Miriam (26 May 1989). "Ancestor Hunting in Spain". Jewish Transcript.
- Weiner, Miriam, June 29, 1990, Soviet Jews Search for Family in Israel
- Weiner, Miriam, January 1991, Search Bureau for Missing Relatives
- Weiner, Miriam, April 30, 1993, Family Reunion: Planning Ahead or Standing in Line at the Deli
- Weiner, Miriam (21 March 1996). "Jewish Genealogy: An American Buys A "Second Home" in Ukraine". San Diego Jewish Times.
