= Meed =

Meed may refer to:

- Benjamin Meed (1918–2006), Jewish Holocaust survivor
- Cato Mead (c. 1761–1846), also spelled Meed, Black Patriot (American Revolutionary War veteran)
- Marianne Meed Ward (born 1966), née Meed, American-born Canadian politician and former journalist
- Vladka Meed (1921–2012), Jewish Polish resistance fighter Holocaust survivor

== See also ==
- Mead (disambiguation)
- Lloyd Meeds (1927–2005), American politician
- Meeds Lake, Minnesota, United States
