= Galician Jews =

Subgroup of ethnic Jews in present-day Western Ukraine

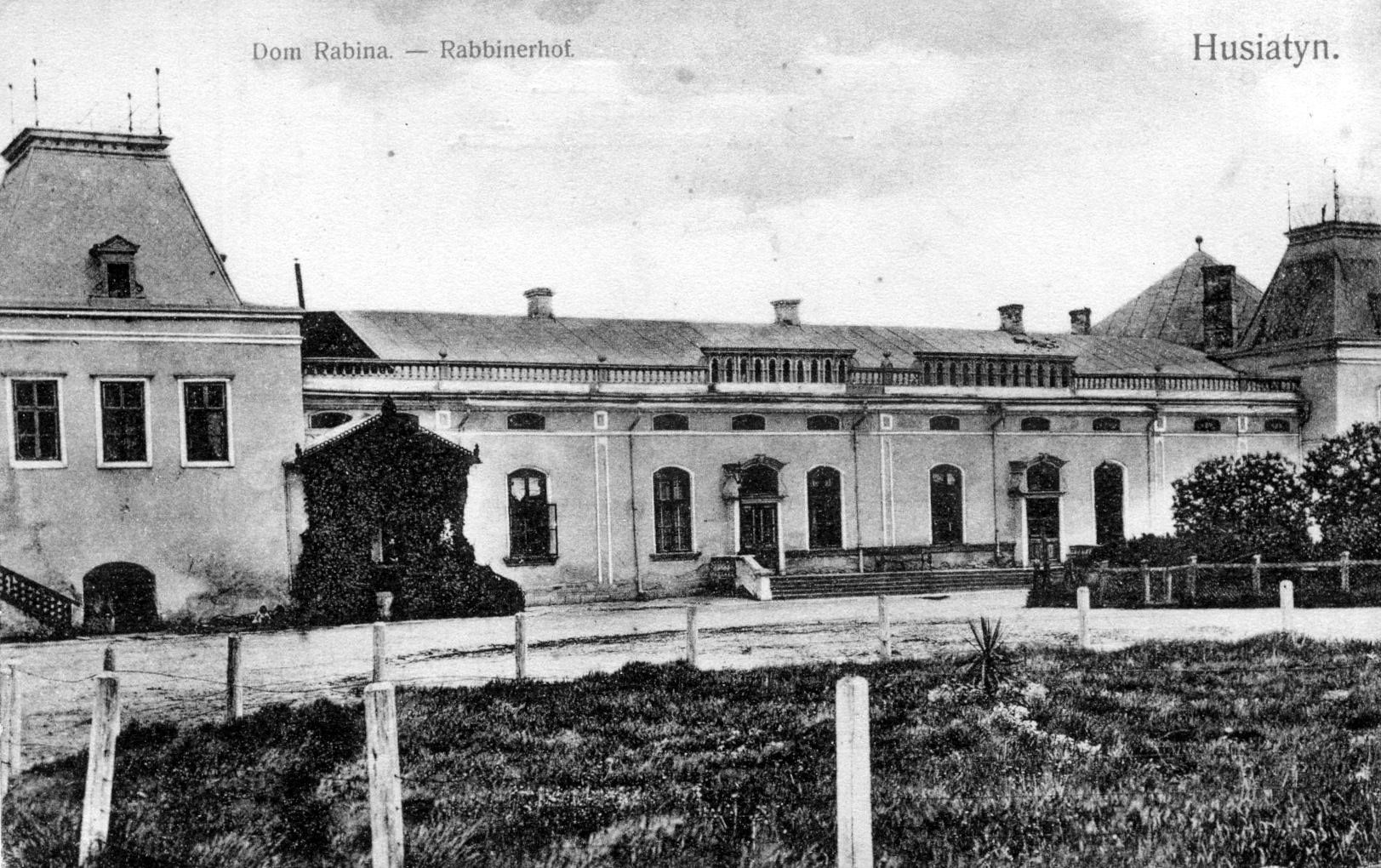
- Home of the Rebbe in Husiatyn, Second Polish Republic

Jewish population in Galicia
- 1772: 150,000–200,000, or 5–6.5% of the total population
- 1857: 449,000, or 9.6% of the total population of the region.
- 1910: 872,000, or 10.9% of the total population

Galician Jews or Galitzianers (Yiddish: גאַליציאַנער, romanized: Galitsianer) are members of the subgroup of Ashkenazi Jews originating and developed in the Kingdom of Galicia and Lodomeria and Bukovina from contemporary western Ukraine (Lviv, Ivano-Frankivsk, and Ternopil Oblasts) and from south-eastern Poland (Subcarpathian and Lesser Poland). Galicia proper, which was inhabited by Ruthenians, Poles and Jews, became a royal province within Austria-Hungary after the Partitions of Poland in the late 18th century. Galician Jews primarily spoke Yiddish.

== Demographics ==
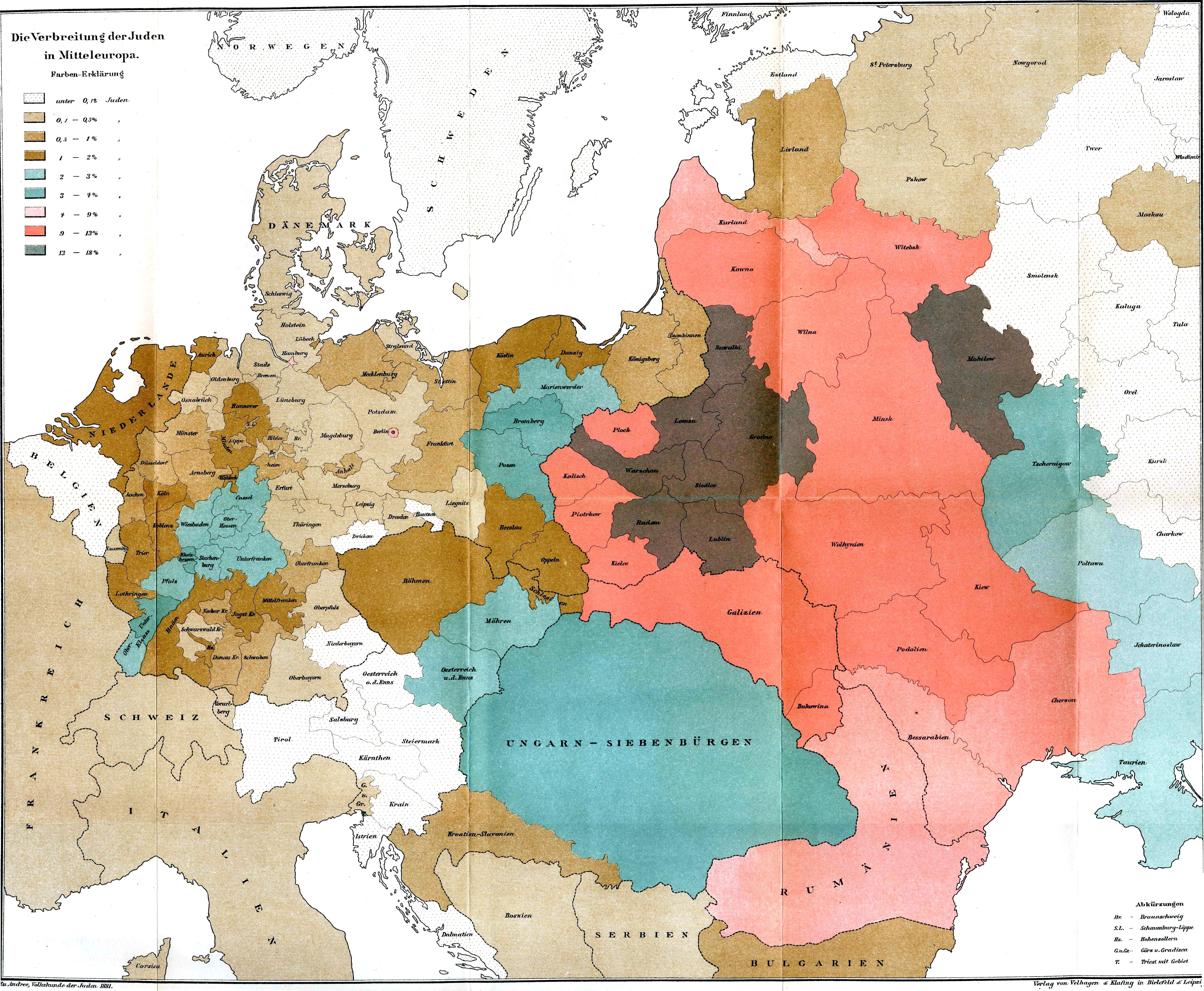
The Jews in Europe (1881). Galicia is located immediately northeast of the Hungarian district

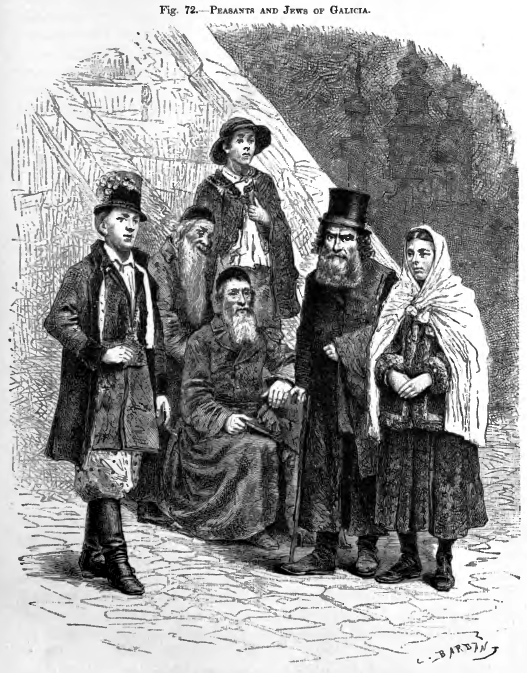
Peasants and Jews from Galicia, c. 1886

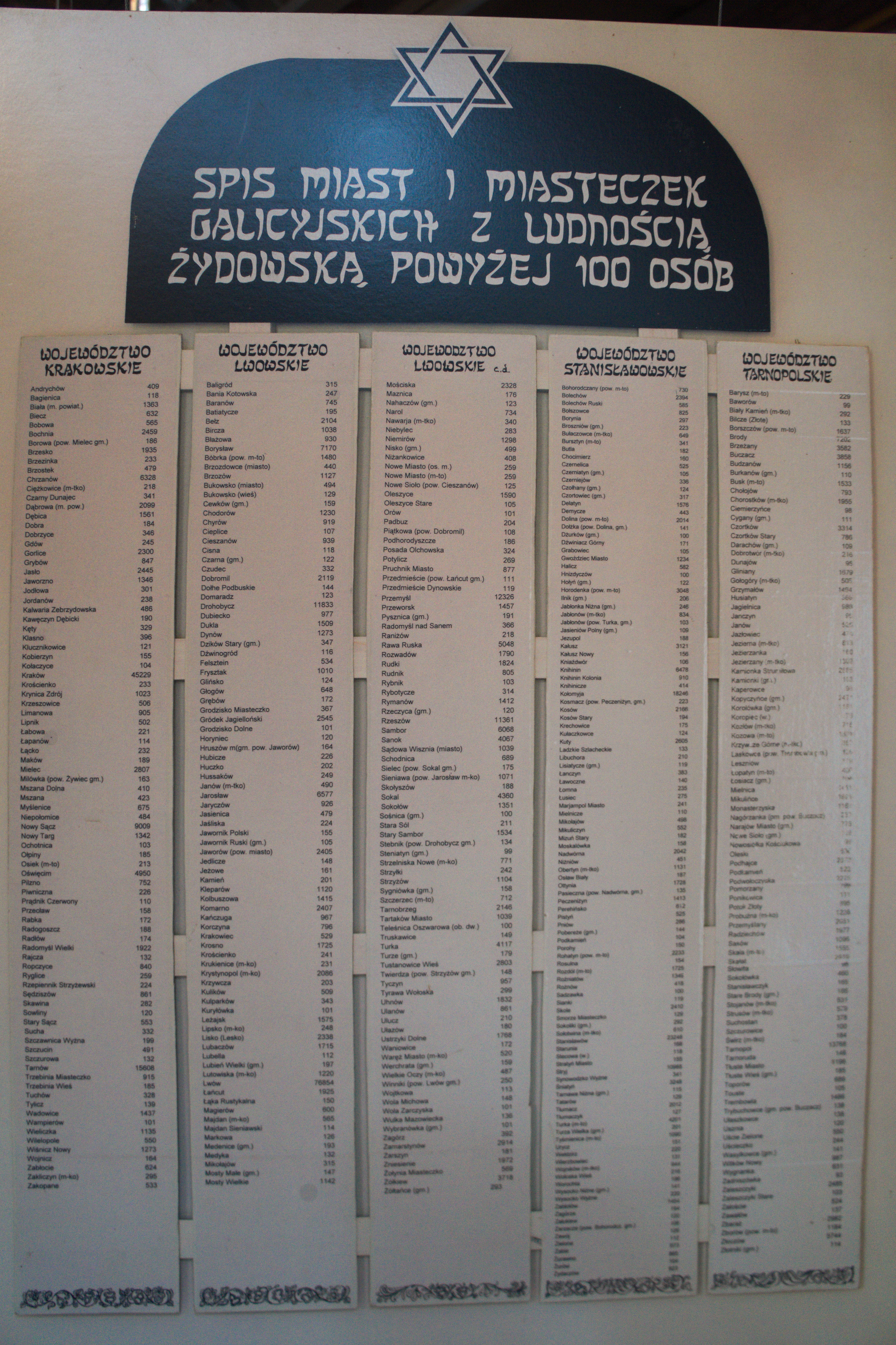
Population of Jews before World War II in Galicia. Largest Jewish population was in Lviv with 76,854, second was Kraków with 45,229 (Galicia Jewish Museum)

In the modern period, Jews were the third most numerous ethnic group in Big Galicia, after Poles and Ruthenians. At the time that Galicia was annexed by Austria (i.e. the Habsburg monarchy), in 1772, there were approximately 150,000 to 200,000 Jews residing there, comprising 5–6.5% of the total population; by 1857 the Jewish population had risen to 449,000, or 9.6% of the total population. In 1910, the 872,000 Jews living in Galicia comprised 10.9% of the total population, compared to approximately 45.4% Poles, 42.9% Ruthenian, and 0.8% Germans.

== Society ==
Most of Galician Jewry lived poorly, largely working in small workshops and enterprises, and as craftsmen—including tailors, carpenters, hat makers, jewelers and opticians. Almost 80 percent of all tailors in Galicia were Jewish. The main occupation of Jews in towns and villages was trade: wholesale, stationery and retail. However, the Jewish inclination towards education was overcoming barriers. The number of Jewish intellectual workers proportionally was much higher than that of Ruthenian or Polish ones in Galicia. Of 1,700 physicians in Galicia, 1,150 were Jewish; 41 percent of workers in culture, theaters and cinema, over 65 percent of barbers, 43 percent of dentists, 45 percent of senior nurses in Galicia were Jewish, and 2,200 Jews were lawyers. For comparison, there were only 450 Ruthenian (Ukrainian) lawyers. Galician Jewry produced four Nobel prize winners: Isidor Isaac Rabi (physics), Roald Hoffman (chemistry), Georges Charpak (physics) and S.Y. Agnon (literature). Henry Roth, who wrote Call It Sleep, was a Galician Jew whose family migrated to the U.S. in the first decade of the 20th century.

Jews emerge as population in Galicia largely after the Black Death in the 14th century from Western and Central Europe.

== History ==
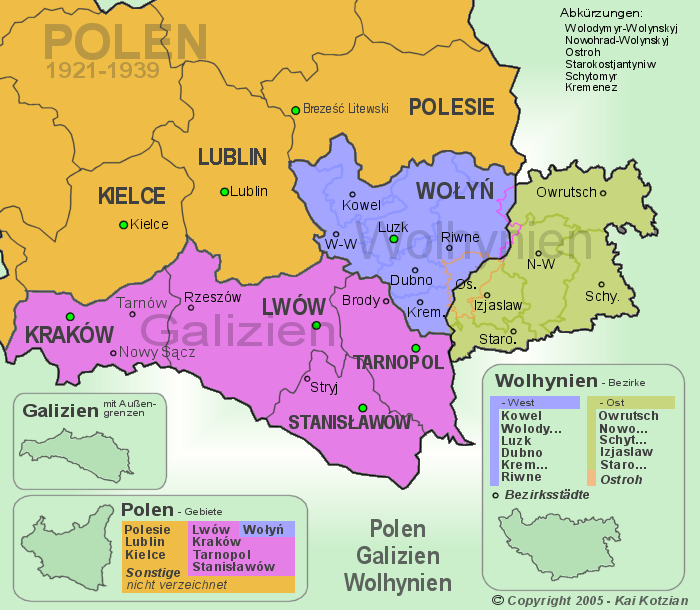
Galicia in relation to Volhynia (east and west) between the two world wars

Jews are recorded as arriving from Western and Central Europe to Galicia largely after the Black Death in the 14th century. Under Habsburg rule, Galicia's Jewish population increased sixfold, from 144,000 in 1776 to 872,000 in 1910, due to a high birth rate and a steady stream of refugees fleeing pogroms in the neighboring Russian Empire. The Jews constituted one third of the population of many cities and came to dominate parts of the local economy such as retail sales and trade. They were also successful in the government; emancipated in 1867, Galician Jews constituted 58 percent of Galicia's civil servants and judges by 1897. During the 19th century Galicia and its main city, Lviv (Lemberg in Yiddish), became a center of Yiddish literature. Lviv was the home of the world's first Yiddish-language daily newspaper, the Lemberger Togblat.

Towards the end of World War I, Galicia became a battleground of the Polish-Ukrainian War, which erupted in November 1918. During the conflict, 1,200 Jews joined the Ukrainian Galician Army and formed an all-Jewish Ukrainian battalion called Zhydivs’kyy Kurin (UHA). In exchange, they were allotted 10% of the seats in the parliament of the West Ukrainian People's Republic which emerged in the same month and was disbanded nine months later. The West Ukrainian government respected Jewish neutrality during the Polish-Ukrainian conflict by an order of Yevhen Petrushevych, which protected Jews from being mobilized against their will or forced to contribute to the Ukrainian military effort. Both Ukrainian and pro-Ukrainian Jewish armed units suffered significant losses as they retreated from Galicia before the army of General Edward Rydz-Śmigły. Although the Polish losses were estimated at more than 10,000 dead and wounded, the Western Ukrainian army lost in excess of 15,000 men. "Despite the official neutrality, some Jewish men had been noticed aiding the combat Ukrainian units, and this fact alone caused a great enthusiasm in the Ukrainian press." Reportedly, the Council of Ministers of the West Ukrainian People's Republic provided assistance to Jewish victims of the Polish pogrom in Lviv, wrote Alexander Prusin. Nevertheless, as noted by Robert Blobaum from West Virginia University, many more pogroms and assaults against Galician Jews were perpetrated by the Ukrainian side in rural areas and other towns. Between 22 and 26 March 1919, during massacres in Zhytomyr (Jitomir), between 500 and 700 Jews lost their lives at the hands of armed men from the Ukrainian republican army led by Symon Petliura. The chief organizer of the pogrom became minister of war soon thereafter. Simultaneous Ukrainian pogroms took place in Berdichev, Uma, and Cherniakhov among other places.

=== Peace of Riga ===
The Polish–Soviet War ended with the Peace of Riga signed in March 1921. The borders between Poland and Soviet Russia remained in force until the invasion of Poland in September 1939, although serious abuses against the Jews, including pogroms, continued in Soviet Ukraine. The rights of minorities in the newly reborn Second Polish Republic were protected by a series of explicit clauses in the Versailles Treaty signed by President Paderewski. In 1921, Poland's March Constitution gave the Jews the same legal rights as other citizens and guaranteed them religious tolerance and freedom of religious holidays. The number of Jews migrating to Poland from Ukraine and Soviet Russia grew rapidly. According to the Polish national census of 1921, there were 2,845,364 Jews living in the country; but, by late 1938 that number had grown by over 16% to approximately 3,310,000. Between the end of the Polish–Soviet War and late 1938, the Jewish population of the Republic had grown by over 464,000.

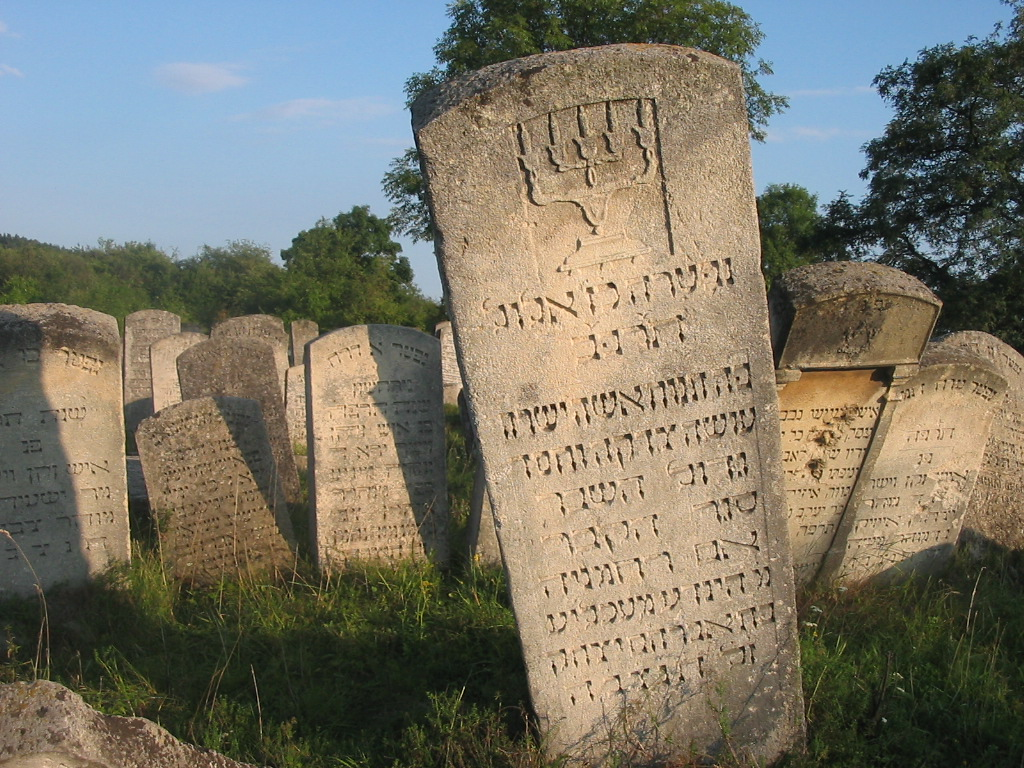
Galician Jewish cemetery in Buchach, western Ukraine, 2005

In September 1939, most of Galicia passed to Soviet Ukraine. The majority of Galician Jews were murdered during the Holocaust. Most survivors migrated to Israel, the United States, the United Kingdom or Australia. In 1959, the census showed 29,701 Jews were living in Lviv province. A small number have remained in Ukraine or Poland.

== Culture ==
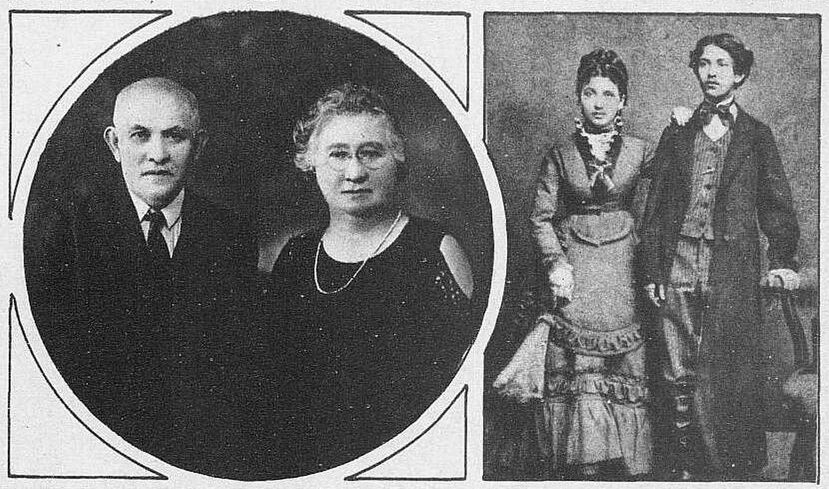
Mr. and Mrs. Hyman Bauman, a Galician Jewish couple, as they appeared on their wedding day in 1876 (right) and a half century later in 1926 (left)

In the popular perception, Galitzianers were considered to be more emotional and prayerful than their rivals, the Litvaks, who thought of them as irrational and uneducated. They, in turn, held the Litvaks in disdain, derogatively referring to them as tseylem-kop ("cross heads"), or Jews assimilated to the point of being Christian. This coincides with the fact that Hasidism was most influential in Ukraine and southern Poland but was fiercely resisted in Lithuania (and even the form of Hasidism that took root there, namely Chabad, was more intellectually inclined than the other Hasidic groups).

The two groups diverged in their Yiddish accents and even in their cuisine, separated by the so-called Gefilte Fish Line. Galitzianers like things sweet, even to the extent of putting sugar in their fish.

== See also ==
- History of the Jews in Ukraine
- Poverty in Austrian Galicia
- Borshchiv Ghetto
- Jews in Bukovina
- Fortress synagogue
- Galicia Jewish Museum, (Kraków)
- Jewish–Ukrainian relations in Eastern Galicia
- List of Galician (Eastern Europe) Jews
- Three hares
- Wooden synagogues of the former Polish–Lithuanian Commonwealth
- Jewish Roots in Poland
- Jewish Roots in Ukraine and Moldova
- Ostjuden
