= Malcolm H. Stern =

American rabbi, historian and genealogist

Rabbi Malcolm H. Stern

Personal life
- Born: Malcolm Henry Stern; January 29, 1915 Philadelphia, Pennsylvania US
- Died: January 5, 1994 (aged 78) New York City US
- Spouse: Louise Bergman
- Parent(s): Arthur Stern; Henrietta Stern
- Education: University of Pennsylvania; Hebrew Union College
- Occupation: Rabbi; Genealogist

Religious life
- Religion: Judaism
- Denomination: Reform Judaism
- Profession: Genealogist; American Jewish Archives (1949-1994); Director, Rabbinic Placement; Central Conference of American Rabbis (1964-1980)

Jewish leader
- Position: Rabbi
- Synagogue: Ohef Sholom Temple; Norfolk, Virginia
- Began: 1947
- Ended: 1964
- Residence: New York, New York US

Malcolm Henry Stern (January 29, 1915 – January 5, 1994) was an American rabbi, historian, and genealogist. Through the work he did that supported secular genealogical communities and resources, as well as created what is the structure and backbone of current Jewish genealogical societies, Stern's efforts created long-lasting, far-reaching cooperative organizations. For these reasons, Stern has been described as the dean of American Jewish genealogy.

== Early life ==
Stern was born in Philadelphia, to Arthur Kaufman Stern and Henrietta Stern (née Berkowitz). In his early childhood, his family moved from Philadelphia to a farm in Fox Chase, Pennsylvania, where he grew up. He had one brother, Edward Stern.

Stern's family was from the early German Jewish community of Philadelphia. His father and grandfather worked at the family business, Jacob Stern & Sons, where they were hides and tallow processors. In the 1920s, Stern's father sold his share of the business to retire to the farm in Fox Chase; Stern described this as his father's attempts to be a bit of a gentleman farmer, as well as author, playwright, and painter. After the Wall Street Crash of 1929, Stern's father became an independent real estate agent.

Stern's mother was active in organizing Jewish summer camps for Philadelphia-area children. She was involved in supporting the National Farm School (now the Delaware Valley College of Science and Agriculture), which was founded by her uncle Rabbi Joseph Krauskopf in 1896, and where her ashes are now interred. She was also active with the local Juvenile Aid Society. The foster children would often spend Sundays at the family's farm in Fox Chase.

Stern said that when they moved from the tight-knit German Jewish community in Philadelphia to Fox Chase, where they were the first Jews in the neighborhood, he and his brother would get chased home and called anti-semitic names.

=== Education ===
For parts of his childhood, Stern's parents took the family to Europe, where they traveled extensively. He learned German from a German governess in Hamburg. Stern spent seven months in school in Lausanne, Switzerland.

Stern completed a BA from the University of Pennsylvania (1935), followed at Hebrew Union College in Cincinnati: a BA (Hebrew Letters; 1937), an MA (Hebrew Letters, 1941) and PhD (Hebrew Letters in American Jewish History, 1957). Stern completed a Doctor of Divinity at Hebrew Union College (1966).

== Career ==
=== Rabbinic career ===
==== Philadelphia ====
Stern studied as did many of his family at Hebrew Union College, he to be a rabbi.

Stern was assistant rabbi to Rabbi Fineshriber (1941 to 1943) at the Reform Congregation Keneseth Israel, in Philadelphia, his great-uncle, Joseph Krauskopf having served as rabbi. After the war (1946 to 1947), Stern returned to work as a rabbi at Keneseth Israel.

In 1942, Stern was one of 90 Reform rabbis to sign a statement in support of aid to Jews in Palestine, but that did not endorse Zionism. The published statement said that the signatories were "opposing growing secularism and favoring greater emphasis on transcendent moral and religious values and principles in American life."

In 1943, Stern took a sabbatical from his position at Keneseth Israel to serve a Chaplain in the US Army Air Corps. Inflight to India the plane the unit was on crashed at Casablanca. He wrote his father, who shared it with the local press, he thought himself fortunate to suffer only a broken arm and leg;

==== Norfolk, Virginia ====
From 1947 to 1964, Stern was Rabbi of Ohef Sholom Temple in Norfolk, Virginia. While there, he completed a Doctor of Hebrew Letters in 1957 in American Jewish History under the tutelage of Dr. Jacob Rader Marcus.

Stern was an amateur musicologist, writing program notes for the Norfolk Symphony Orchestra. He also served as chairman of the Committee on Synagogue Music of the Central Conference of American Rabbis.

In 1960, Stern served as editor in chief of the Union Songster for Reform Judaism and coordinated the revision of the Union Hymnal, both of which are considered by Reform Jews to be the commonly used hymnals for religious services. He co-edited Songs and Hymns for Gates of Prayer, the New Union Prayer Book (GOP) that is a Reform Jewish siddur. He chaired the committee that created Shaarei Shira/Gates of Song.

==== New York City ====
From 1964 to 1980, Stern was the Central Conference of American Rabbis' first Director of Rabbinic Placement for Reform Judaism, assigning rabbis to congregations.

After leaving CCAR in 1980, Stern joined the Hebrew Union College's faculty as adjunct professor, where he lectured in Jewish History. He was also a field-work counselor for rabbinic students. Stern held both positions until his death. Hebrew Union President, Dr. Alfred Gottschalk, said Stern's "scholarship, his pioneering seminal research in American Jewish genealogy and writings remain a rich legacy and memorial."

=== Genealogy career ===
Genealogy has taught me so much. I have always been fascinated by the interconnection of families. Jewish history, rites, and customs have come alive through my pursuit of roots.

— Rabbi Stern

Stern's interest in genealogy, he said, "started in grade school when he traced the descendants of Charlemagne for an assignment."

From 1949 to 1994, Stern was the genealogist for the American Jewish Archives in Cincinnati.

In 1960, Stern published Americans of Jewish Descent, an extensively, fully sourced, with family tree diagrams of all Jewish families who lived in American pre-1840. The work contained 26,000 names. Two more enlarged editions of the book followed: 1978's First American Jewish Families: 600 Genealogies, 1654–1977 and 1991's First American Jewish Families: 600 Genealogies, 1654–1988, which had over 50,000 surnames. The book was a groundbreaking volume of names and extensive research; many pre-1840 families, learned they had Jewish roots. It was considered one of the most valuable research tools in American Jewish genealogy and history. The work in these books was a source for much of Stephen Birmingham's 1981 book, The Grandees: America's Sephardic Elite.

Stern was responsible for helping to establish the early Jewish genealogical societies in the United States. He was on the committee that hosted the first of what would become the annual International Conference on Jewish Genealogy now sponsored by the International Association of Jewish Genealogical Societies (IAJGS). He was instrumental in founding IAJGS.

During his time as President of the Federation of Genealogical Societies, Stern worked to create the Genealogical Coordinating Committee. In a meeting in Salt Lake City in 1980, Stern brought together leaders from various genealogical entities—FGS, American Society of Genealogists, Association of Genealogical Educators, Association of Professional Genealogists, Board for Certification of Genealogists, International Association of Jewish Genealogical Societies (IAJGS) and the National Genealogical Society—with a goal to foster better relationships between various genealogical groups that had common interests, especially supporting the work of the National Archives and Records Administration (NARA) so it would be available to genealogists. This meeting led to the formation of the Genealogical Coordinating Committee two years later, with a resulting National Archives Gift Fund (now known as the Malcolm H. Stern NARA Gift Fund) established. The purpose of the fund was to support NARA and other genealogical interests. Member organizations donated $1 per genealogist per year.

==== Activism ====
- While in Norfolk, Virginia, Stern was a civil right advocate, working against segregation and racism in the community Rabbi Kerry M. Olitzky said that Stern "fought for the civil rights of African Americans at a time and a place where such a stand was both unpopular and dangerous."
  - In 1951, Stern spoke at the Hunton Branch YMCA's "Y's" Men's Club urging members to donate blood, he said, "in order to show belief in the equality of races, since no distinction on account of color is made between blood donated at the center."
- NARA Independence (1981-1984)
  - In 1981, when President Ronald Reagan's budget threatened the National Archives, Stern spearheaded efforts of genealogy and historical communities to support Archives Independence Bill S1421, in order to make NARA independent. On June 21, 1984, the United States Senate voted unanimously to S. 905, a bill that would separate NARA from the General Services Administration. On August 2, 1984, the House of Representatives passed similar legislation.
- In 1989, Stern testified before the United States Congress, where he stated that the Archivist of the United States should not be an administrator, but rather a scholar.
- In 1990, Stern worked with the National Archives and Records Administration to prepare four American genealogists for a genealogical mission to Russia, where they had been invited to help educate former Soviet archivists on how to respond to American requests for information about Russian ancestry. As part of these efforts, Stern helped to found the Russian-American Genealogical Archival Service (RAGAS).

==== Membership activities ====
Alphabetical by organization

- Trustee, American Jewish Historical Society
- President (1976–1979), American Society of Genealogists. Also: Secretary, 1968–1973; Vice President, 1973-1976
- Trustee, Federation of Genealogical Societies. Also: Vice President, 1985-1988
- President (1979–1984), Jewish Genealogical Society
- Member, Jewish Historical Society of England
- Founder, Jewish Historical Society of New York
- Fellow, National Genealogical Society
- Fellow, New York Genealogical and Biographical Society
- Vice President of Gomez Mill House in Newburgh, New York, oldest surviving Jewish residence (built in 1716) in North America

==== Ten Commandments for Genealogists ====
Stern wrote the Ten Commandments for Genealogists, which has become widely cited and is a cornerstone of Jewish genealogy.

== Honors ==
- 1986: "Living Treasures," by View From the Torch, an organization devoted to promoting New York's cultural, ethnic and artistic diversity. People who have made significant contributions to New York City. Certificate of recognition from the New York Chamber of Commerce and Industry
- 1987: Jewish Genealogical Society (New York), Testimonial Brunch
- 1988: Federation of Genealogical Societies' George E. Williams Award for outstanding contributions to the FGS and to the genealogical community
  - Stern was and is the only Jewish Fellow of both the Federation of Genealogical Societies and the American Society of Genealogists

=== Gift funds/grants ===
- Ongoing: Federation of Genealogical Societies' Malcolm H. Stern NARA Gift Fund. Finances preservation of research materials at National Archives and Records Administration (NARA)
- Ongoing: IAJGS' Rabbi Malcolm Stern Grant

== Personal life ==
In 1941, Stern married Louise Steinhart Bergman. They had no children. In 1994, Stern died in New York City of a heart attack.

Stern's maternal great uncle is the Rabbi Joseph Krauskopf.

== Works and publications ==
Chronological order

=== Archival papers ===
- Stern, Malcolm Henry. Malcolm H. Stern Papers, 1882-1994. New York, NY: American Jewish Archives.

=== Monographs ===
- Stern, Malcolm H. The Jews of Norfolk. Norfolk, Va: M.H. Stern, 1950. OCLC 18772408
- Stern, Malcolm H. Two Studies in the Assimilation of Early American Jewry I. Endogamic. II. Exogamic, Based on Tentatively Complete Genealogical Tables of All Jewish Families Settled in America Prior to 1840. Thesis/dissertation. Cincinnati: Hebrew Union College/Jewish Institute of Religion, 1956. OCLC 2902235
- Stern, Malcolm H. The Descendants of Salomon Jaroslawski. S.l: s.n., 1956. OCLC 221819393
- Stern, Malcolm H. The Function of Genealogy in American Jewish History. Cincinnati: (Hebrew Union College Press), 1958. OCLC 21170378
- Postal, Bernard, and Malcolm H. Stern. Tourist's Guide to Jewish History in the Caribbean. [New York]: American Airlines, 1975. OCLC 2931264
- Stern, Malcolm H. Jewish Family Genealogies and Histories. Salt Lake City, Utah: Filmed by the Genealogical Society of Utah, 1977. OCLC 866812874
- Stern, Malcolm H. Death Notices, Mostly from Charleston Newspapers, from Elzas Papers. Salt Lake City, Utah: Filmed by the Genealogical Society of Utah, 1977. OCLC 866106014
- Stern, Malcolm H. Tracing Your Jewish Roots. Cincinnati, OH: American Jewish Archives on the Cincinnati Campus of the Hebrew Union College-Jewish Institute of Religion, 1977. OCLC 4045015

==== Jewish Families Series ====
- Stern, Malcolm H. Americans of Jewish Descent: A Compendium of Genealogy. Publications of the American Jewish Archives, 5. New York: Ktav Pub. House, 1960. ISBN 978-0-870-68168-4 OCLC 264918886
- Stern, Malcolm H. First American Jewish Families: 600 Genealogies, 1654-1977. Cincinnati: American Jewish Archives, 1978. ISBN 978-0-870-68443-2 OCLC 3966272
- Stern, Malcolm H. First American Jewish Families: 600 Genealogies, 1654-1988. Baltimore, Md: Ottenheimer Publishers, 1991. ISBN 978-0-870-68443-2 OCLC 27267877
  - First American Jewish Families at American Jewish Archives

=== Articles ===
- Stern, Malcolm H. "Monticello and the Levy Family". The Journal of the Southern Jewish Historical Society. Vol. 1, no. 2 (October 1959). pp. 19–23. OCLC 808063492
- Stern, Malcolm H. What Shall We Sing: Music in Our Worship. 1960. OCLC 79052856
- Stern, Malcolm H. "New Light on the Jewish Settlement of Savannah." 1963. Reprinted from American Jewish Historical Quarterly, v.52, no. 3, Mar. 1963. pp. 169–199. OCLC 315947
- Stern, Malcolm H. The Descendants of Moses Son of Naphtali of Hofheim or Moses Hofheimer. 1964. Hofheimer Family, Manuscripts and Rare Books Department, Swem Library, College of William & Mary. OCLC 32045307
- Stern, Malcolm H. "The Sheftall Diaries: Vital Records of Savannah Jewry (1733-1808)." 1965. Detached from American Jewish Historical Society, American Jewish Historical Quarterly, New York, v. LIV, No. 3 (March, 1965). pp. 243–277. OCLC 7501554
- Stern, Malcolm H. "Two Jewish Functionaries in Colonial Pennsylvania." Philadelphia, PA: Maurice Jacobs, Inc., 1967. Reprinted from American Jewish Historical Quarterly, v.57, no. 1. pp. 24–51. OCLC 1067947
- Stern, Malcolm H. "Necrology: Thomas Jefferson Tobias (1906-1970)." Philadelphia, Pa: Press of Maurice Jacobs, 1971. Reprinted from American Jewish Historical Quarterly, v. 60, no. 3 (March, 1971). pp. 304–305 OCLC 48976969
- Stern, Malcolm H. '"A Successful Caribbean Restoration: The Nevis Story." Reprint from American Jewish Historical Quarterly, Vol. 61, Nov. 1, 1971. pp. 19–32. OCLC 173033350
- Stern, Malcolm H. "Reforming of Reform Judaism - Past, Present, and Future." Reprint from American Jewish Historical Quarterly, Vol 63, No. 2, 1973. pp. 111–137. OCLC 172988164
- Stern, Malcolm H. "South Carolina Jewish Marriage Settlements, 1785-1839." Washington, D.C.: National Genealogical Society, 1978. Detached from National Genealogical Society Quarter. v.66, no. 2 (June 1978). pp. 105–111. OCLC 9027444
- Stern, Malcolm H. "New Sources of Jewish Genealogy." From National Genealogical Society Quarterly, v. 66 (1978). pp. 281–284. OCLC 530405078
- Stern, Malcolm H. "The Role of the Rabbi in the South." Kaganaff, Nathan and Melvin I. Urofsky, Editors. Turn to the South, Essays on Southern Jewry, 1979. pp. 21–32. OCLC 73033349
- Stern, Malcolm H. "Jewish Genealogy: An Annotated Bibliography." Nashville: American Association for State and Local History, 1981. Technical leaflet (American Association for State and Local History), #138. Detached from History News. v. 36, no. 5 (May 1981). OCLC 7982518
- Stern, Malcolm H., and A. Stanley Dreyfus. "Jews of Texas: Some Sources for Their Genealogy." Houston, Tex.: Texas State Genealogical Society, 1982. From Stirpes, v.22 no. 4 (Dec. 1982). OCLC 11027250
- Peck, Abraham J., and Jonathan D. Sarna. Biz Hundert Un Tsvantsik!: A Tribute Volume for Dr. Jacob Rader Marcus on the Occasion of His 90th Birthday. Cincinnati, Ohio: Hebrew Union College-Jewish Institute of Religion, 1986. OCLC 14228252 - Stern contributed a tribute to his teacher, Dr. Marcus, in this volume.
- Stern, Malcolm H. "Portuguese Sephardim in the Americas," Cohen, Martin A., and Abraham J. Peck. Sephardim in the Americas: Studies in Culture and History. Tuscaloosa: University of Alabama Press, 1993. ISBN 978-0-817-30707-3 OCLC 27383780
- Stern, Malcolm. "The year they closed the schools : the Norfolk story." Bauman, Mark K., and Berkley Kalin. The Quiet Voices: Southern Rabbis and Black Civil Rights, 1880s to 1990s. Tuscaloosa, Ala: University of Alabama Press, 1997, 2007. ISBN 978-0-817-35429-9 OCLC 318668604

=== Lectures, speeches, etc. ===
- Stern, Malcolm H. Church Records of the United States, Part B: Part 1 Jewish Synagogue Records. Salt Lake City: Genealogical Society of Utah, 1969. Paper presented at the World Conference on Records and Genealogical Seminar, Salt Lake City, Utah, 5–8 August 1969. OCLC 38598748
- Stern, Malcolm H., and Marc Angel. New York's Early Jews: Some Myths and Misconceptions. A Lecture by Malcolm H. Stern, with Response by Marc D. Angel. New York: Jewish Historical Society of New York, 1975. Annual Meeting, Jewish Historical Society of New York, at Congregation Shearith Israel on April 10, 1975. OCLC 2093217
- Stern, Malcolm H. Consecrated to Them: Ordination Address, Class of 1979, Hebrew Union College-Jewish Institute of Religion, Cincinnati, Ohio, June 9, 1979. Cincinnati: Hebrew Union College-Jewish Institute of Religion, 1979. OCLC 5909834
- Stern, Malcolm H. Jewish Families: Their Assimilation into North American Culture. World Conference on Records; Preserving our Heritage, Aug. 12–15, 1980. ser. 327. U.S.A.: Corp. of the President of the Church of Jesus Christ of Latter-day Saints, 1980. OCLC 456460832
- Stern, Malcolm H. Fraunces Tavern Museum and the American Jewish Historical Society Present "A Walking Tour of Early Jewish New York; " with the Cooperation of the Jewish Historical Society of New York. New York: Fraunces Tavern Museum, 1980. NYPL: MN *ZZ-20157. 12 pages, includes map. OCLC 14452616
- Stern, Malcolm H. Fraunces Tavern Museum and the American Jewish Historical Society Present "A Walking Tour of Early Jewish New York". New York: Fraunces Tavern Museum, 1982. Walking tour of early Jewish New York, 2 pages, includes map. OCLC 8675562
- Stern, Malcolm H. History of Jewish Surnaming. Pekin, Ill: Triad, 1984. Audio cassette. Recorded July 22–25, 1984, at the Fourth National Summer Seminar on Jewish Genealogy. OCLC 12709407
- Stern, Malcolm H. "Jacob R. Marcus : American Jewish history personified." Stern, Malcolm H., A. Bartlett Giamatti, and Lou H. Silberman. Founders Day Addresses, 1986. Cincinnati, Ohio: Hebrew Union College-Jewish Institute of Religion, 1986. OCLC 59280369
- Stern, Malcolm H. Resources at [the] DAR Library. Toulon, IL: Triad, 1988. Audio cassette. Recorded at Seventh National Seminar in Jewish Genealogy, Washington, D.C., 1988. OCLC 19272445
- Stern, Malcolm H. Where Was Bubba Born? The Changing Map of Europe (1492-1952). Toulon, IL: Triad, 1989. Audio cassette. Recorded at the 8th national seminar on Jewish genealogy, June 1989, Philadelphia, Pa. OCLC 80415702
- Stern, Malcolm H., and Harold I. Saperstein. Centennial Birthday Party Reminiscences. Palm Desert, Calif: Convention Cassettes Unlimited, 1989. Audio cassettes. Recorded at centennial convention of CCAR, June 1989, Cincinnati, Ohio. OCLC 77642906
- Stern, Malcolm H. Resources for Sephardic Research. Teaneck, N.J.: Association of Jewish Genealogical Societies, 1991. Audio cassette. Recorded at Third International Seminar on Jewish Genealogy, July 1991, Doubletree Hotel, Salt Lake City, Utah. OCLC 84063468
- Jewish Genealogical Society (New York, N.Y.), and Malcolm H. Stern. The Jewish Genealogical Society Celebrates Its Tenth Anniversary and Honors Its President Emeritus, Rabbi Malcolm H. Stern: Sunday, November 15, 1987. New York, N.Y. : Jewish Genealogical Society, 1987. OCLC 24937927
  - Although planned before his death, event was held posthumously in Stern's honor

== See also ==
- Jewish genealogy
- Federation of Genealogical Societies
- International Association of Jewish Genealogical Societies (IAJGS)
- JewishGen
