= Jewish Roots in Ukraine and Moldova =

1999 book

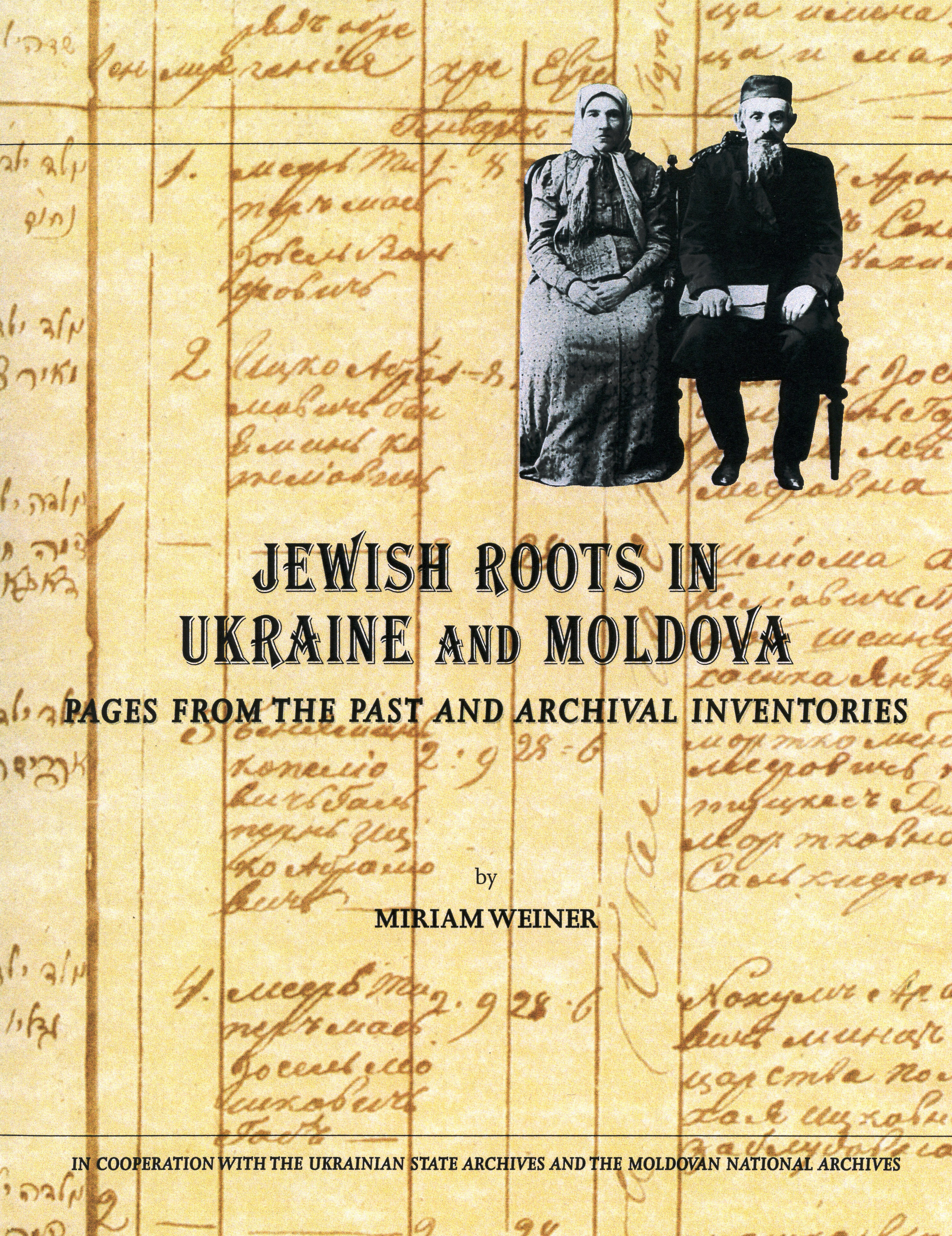
- Author: Miriam Weiner
- Language: English
- Genre: Genealogy
- Publisher: Miriam Weiner Routes to Roots Foundation, YIVO Institute for Jewish Research
- Publication date: 1999
- Publication place: United States
- Media type: Print (hardcover)
- Pages: 600
- ISBN: 978-0-965-65081-6
- OCLC: 607423469
- Dewey Decimal: 929.3477
- LC Class: DS135.U4 W45 1999
- Preceded by: Jewish Roots in Poland
- Website: RTRFoundation.org

Jewish Roots in Ukraine and Moldova (full title: Jewish Roots in Ukraine and Moldova: Pages from the Past and Archival Inventories) is a book created by genealogist Miriam Weiner and co-published by The Miriam Weiner Routes to Roots Foundation and YIVO Institute for Jewish Research. A searchable database of updated archival holdings listed in the book is available in the Archive Database on the Routes to Roots Foundation website.

== Overview ==
In 1999, in official cooperation with the Ukraine State Archives (Ukraïnskyi derzhavnyi arkhiv) and the Moldova National Archives (Arhivă Naţională a Republicii Moldova), Weiner authored and published Jewish Roots in Ukraine and Moldova. The book includes archival holdings of the Ukraine State Archives and its branch archives throughout the country and the Moldova National Archives in Chișinău as well as local town hall documents throughout Ukraine and Moldova. The book also features document examples, maps, antique postcards depicting towns and daily life, and modern-day photographs. There are individual town listings for localities throughout both countries.

The book includes an inventory of 1,392 towns and over 5,000 record entries for these towns. Sources of the material were the Ukrainian State Archives, Moldova National Archives, Ministry of Justice (ZAGS) in Ukraine and Moldova, Polish State Archives (AGAD in Warsaw), Urzad Stanu Cywilnego (Warsaw-Srodmiescie), and the Jewish Historical Institute in Warsaw. There are over 1,200 images in the book, of which there are 970 color photos of 190 towns, 121 black and white photos, 115 document examples, and 20 color maps.

The archives of Ukraine and Moldova were not accessible to the public for genealogical research purposes until the two countries gained independence in 1991. Once available, the ability to access even one birth record could take more than a week. Weiner made repeated visits to Ukraine and was aided by the former mayor of Otaci, Moldova, who served as a driver and translator. The book and the Routes to Roots Archive Database are the only known town-by-town inventories of archival documents (published in English) in that these lists were officially sanctioned by the directors of both the State Archives and Ministry of Justice (includes local town hall archives) in Ukraine and Moldova. The Ukrainian State Archives commented, "We thank Ms. Weiner for her outstanding work in publishing (in English) the first guide to archival inventories in Ukraine to be officially sanctioned by the Ukrainian State Archives. After compiling this material, Ms. Weiner submitted the draft archival inventories, which were then sent out to our archivists for review. They have done so to the best of their abilities. We consider the verification process by our archivists essential to the validity of any publication about our holdings."

Jewish Roots in Ukraine and Moldova took over seven years to complete. Weiner worked with two directors of the State Archives of Ukraine, Borys Ivanenko and Dr. Ruslan Pyrih, and collaborated with archivists throughout Ukraine to compile the information for the book. The Director of the Moldovan National Archives, Antonina A. Berzoy, contributed an article on the archives there, as did other regional scholars and experts.

== Reception ==
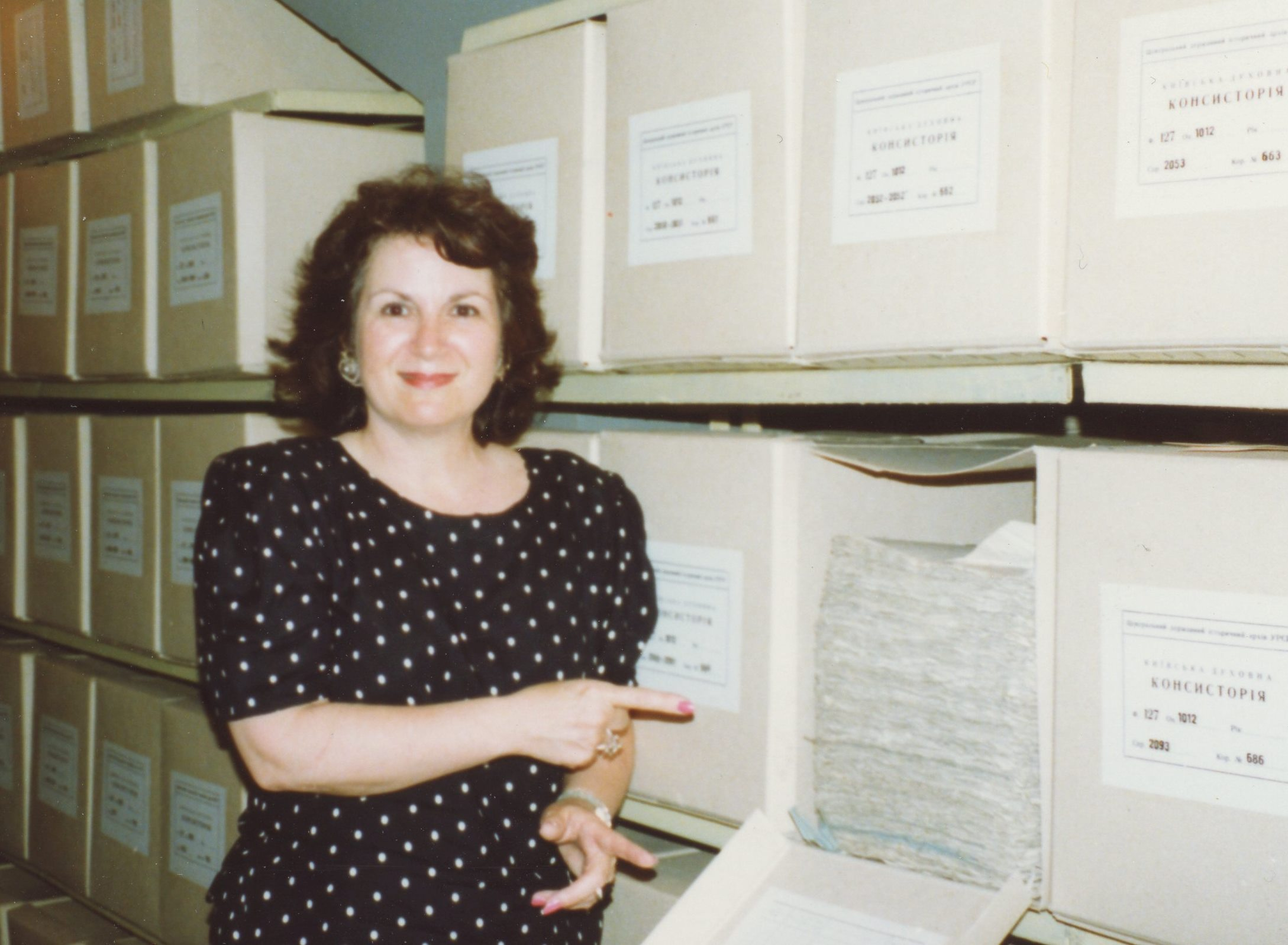
Miriam Weiner in the Kiev Historical Archives in Ukraine points to boxes of historic documents dating back several hundred years, Aug 1991

Jewish Roots in Ukraine and Moldova was the first work of its kind, as it collected details on archival documents from Ukraine and Moldova that had previously been deemed inaccessible or fundamentally lost. The book also serves multiple functions, so its diversity of offerings often made categorizing what the book was difficult. In the New York Jewish Genealogical Society, Inc.'s publication, DOROT, their detailed review focused on the extensive scope of the materials presented in the book: over 1,200 images of almost 200 towns, and the inclusion of over 5,000 documents of almost 1,400 towns.

This book received high praise from fellow authors including:

Dr. Michael Berenbaum (one of the world’s pre-eminent Holocaust scholars, authors and former Project Director of the United States Holocaust Memorial Museum), provides the Foreword for the book, saying: "Miriam Weiner's painstaking work, Jewish Roots in Ukraine and Moldova, like her earlier work, Jewish Roots in Poland, is most valuable. She has initiated and made available to the public for the first time, in a concise and readable form, the inventories of records relating to the Jewish experience in these countries that are held in their archives. She has taken us through these archives and offered us a peek at their treasures. She has empowered fellow pilgrims -- scholar and novices alike -- to begin their own search, to commence their own journey. These efforts must be celebrated. Miriam was brave and bold, persistent, disciplined and demanding. She has opened to us an entire world for exploration and has saved all of us, even the most informed, months of effort and false starts. She has made a daunting task appear ever more possible, even more beckoning. This book is not Miriam's first contribution to memory, but it must surely rank among her finest."

Chaim Potok (American author, novelist, playwright, editor, rabbi and author of The Chosen) who said: "Miriam Weiner's Jewish Roots in Ukraine and Moldova is an invaluable source book replete with photographs, documents and archival inventories of a world that should be of vital interest to all who treasure the past and want to keep vivid our memories of it."

Leon Uris (American author of historical fiction who wrote many bestselling books, including Exodus and Trinity) who said: "Miriam Weiner, a courageous and brilliant historian and archivist, has haunted the archives of Eastern Europe, painstakingly piercing together the world that was. Here she has memorialized hundreds of shtetls and towns through document examples and photographs. Her earlier book on Polish Jewry alerted us to the fact that she was equal to the task. Jewish Roots in Ukraine and Moldova is part of a masterwork of love and remembrance, so important to me and my children."

Jewish Standard noted the fact that Jewish Roots in Ukraine and Moldova presents a wide range of information that is both useful and interesting.

The New York Times praised the book for being lavishly illustrated, voluminous encyclopedic guides that provide glimpses of life in Poland before World War II.

At the New York City book launch that was held at the Consulate of Ukraine in September 1999, Dr. Ruslan Pyrih, director of the Main Archival Administration of Ukraine, stressed the importance of the book not just from a genealogical perspective, but from a historical perspective.

Prior to her genealogy, Weiner was the Executive Director at the American Gathering of Jewish Holocaust Survivors in New York City and her book "Jewish Roots in Ukraine and Moldova" was featured in the AGJHS publication "Together" where it was lauded as "Another Masterwork of Love and Remembrance."

== Awards ==
- 1999: Jewish Book Council, National Jewish Book Award, Reference (Finalist) for Jewish Roots in Ukraine and Moldova
- 2000: Association of Jewish Libraries, AJL Research and Special Libraries Division Reference Award for Jewish Roots in Ukraine and Moldova
- 2000: International Association of Jewish Genealogical Societies, Outstanding Contribution to Jewish Genealogy via Print for Jewish Roots in Ukraine and Moldova

== Selected excerpts ==
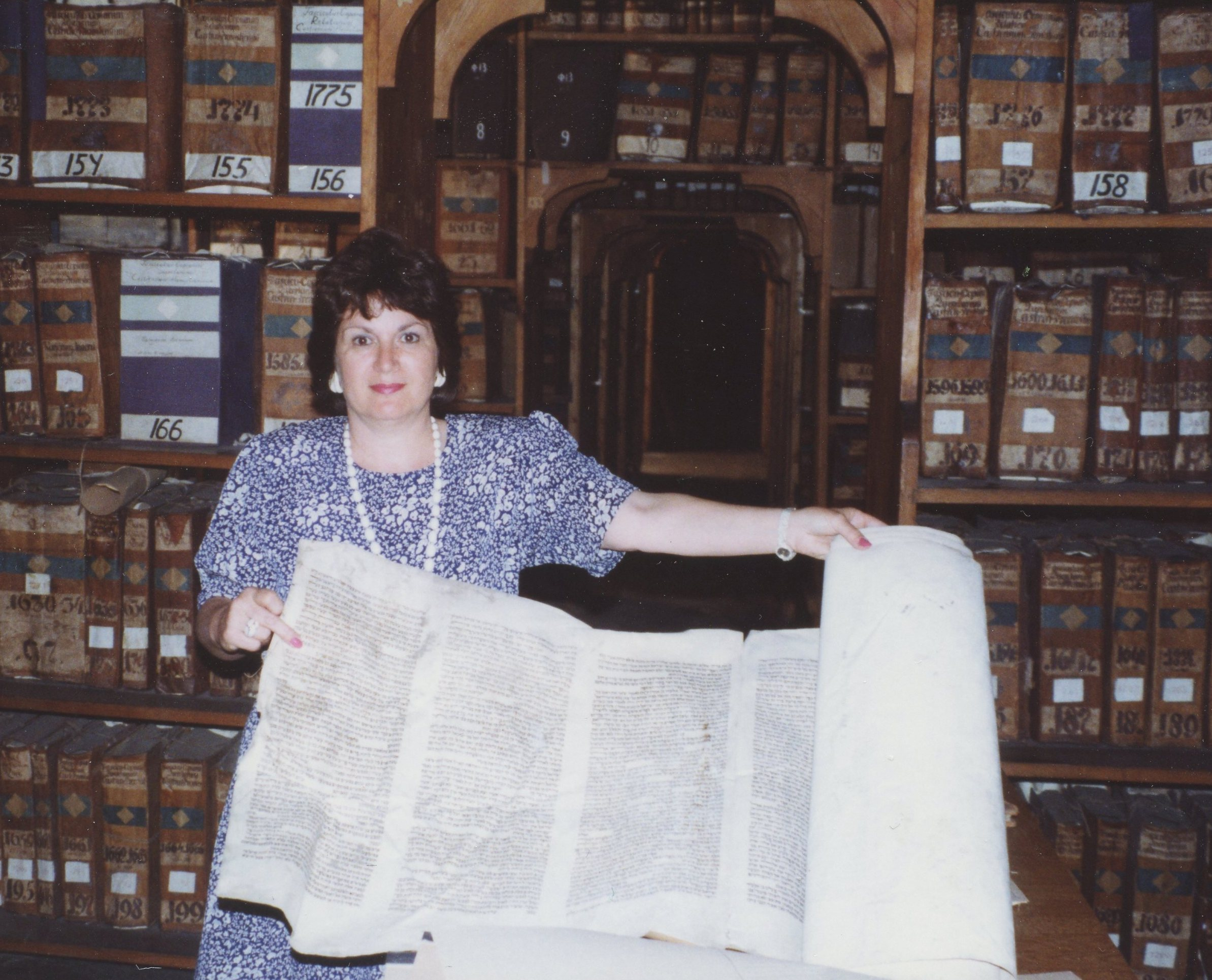
Miriam Weiner in the Lviv Historical Archives (Ukraine) with a Torah from their extensive collection, July 1990

Note: Jewish Roots in Ukraine and Moldova is out of print. Miriam Weiner's non-profit Routes to Roots Foundation has made excerpts from the book available on the organization's website

- Berenbaum, Michael (1999). Foreword by Dr. Michael Berenbaum (PDF). Los Angeles, CA: Survivors of the Shoah Visual History Foundation. pp. ix–x. ISBN 978-0-96-565081-6 – via Jewish Roots in Ukraine and Moldova: Pages from the Past and Archival Inventories, Miriam Weiner Routes to Roots Foundation.

=== Ukraine ===
- Pirig, Ruslan Y. (May 1999). Acknowledgements: Dr. Ruslan Y. Pirig, Director, Main Archival Administration (PDF) (in English and Ukrainian). Warsaw, Poland: Ukrainian State Archives. pp. xii–xiii. ISBN 978-0-96-565080-9.

=== Moldova ===
- Berzoy, Antonina A. (December 1998). Acknowledgements: Antonina A. Berzoy, Director (PDF) (in English and Romanian). Kishinev, Moldova: Moldovan National Archives. pp. xiv–xv. ISBN 978-0-96-565080-9.
- Isac, Vasile (August 2005). Acknowledgements: Vasile Isac, Director (PDF) (in English and Romanian). Kishinev, Moldova: State Archival Services, Republic of Moldovas. pp. x–xi. ISBN 978-0-96-565080-9.

== See also ==
- Jewish Roots in Poland
