= JRI-Poland =

Online Jewish genealogy resource

Jewish Records Indexing-Poland
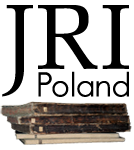
- Abbreviation: JRI-Poland
- Formation: 1995; 31 years ago
- Founder: Stanley M. Diamond
- Type: Non-Profit
- Services: Databases
- Fields: Jewish genealogy
- Executive Director: Stanley M. Diamond
- Website: jri-poland.org

JRI-Poland, also known as Jewish Records Indexing-Poland, is an online resource for Jewish genealogists searching for Jewish vital records for the current and former territories of Poland.

== History ==
JRI-Poland was founded in 1995 by genealogists Stanley M. Diamond, and Michael Tobias, and Steven Zedeck. Diamond was researching the Beta Thalassemia genetic trait, which he suspected was present in Ashkenazi Jewish families in his family tree.

In February 2013, a historic agreement was negotiated between JRI-Poland and the Polish State Archives to make more records available in digitized form.

In 2014, JRI-Poland was instrumental in the Finding Your Roots episode featuring the family history of Alan Dershowitz, Carole King, and Tony Kushner according to Josh Gleason, producer, who said that the program was able to provide information about the subject's 3rd and 4th ancestors that would otherwise have been unavailable except for the work of JRI-Poland.

In 2016, records found in the JRI-Poland databases provided confirmation of Holocaust survivor Yisrael Kristal being the oldest living man.

== Awards ==
- 1999: IAJGS Award for Outstanding Contribution via the Internet Award
- 2014: IAJGS Award for Outstanding Contribution to Jewish Genealogy via the Internet
