= Jewish Roots in Poland =

1997 book by Miriam Weiner

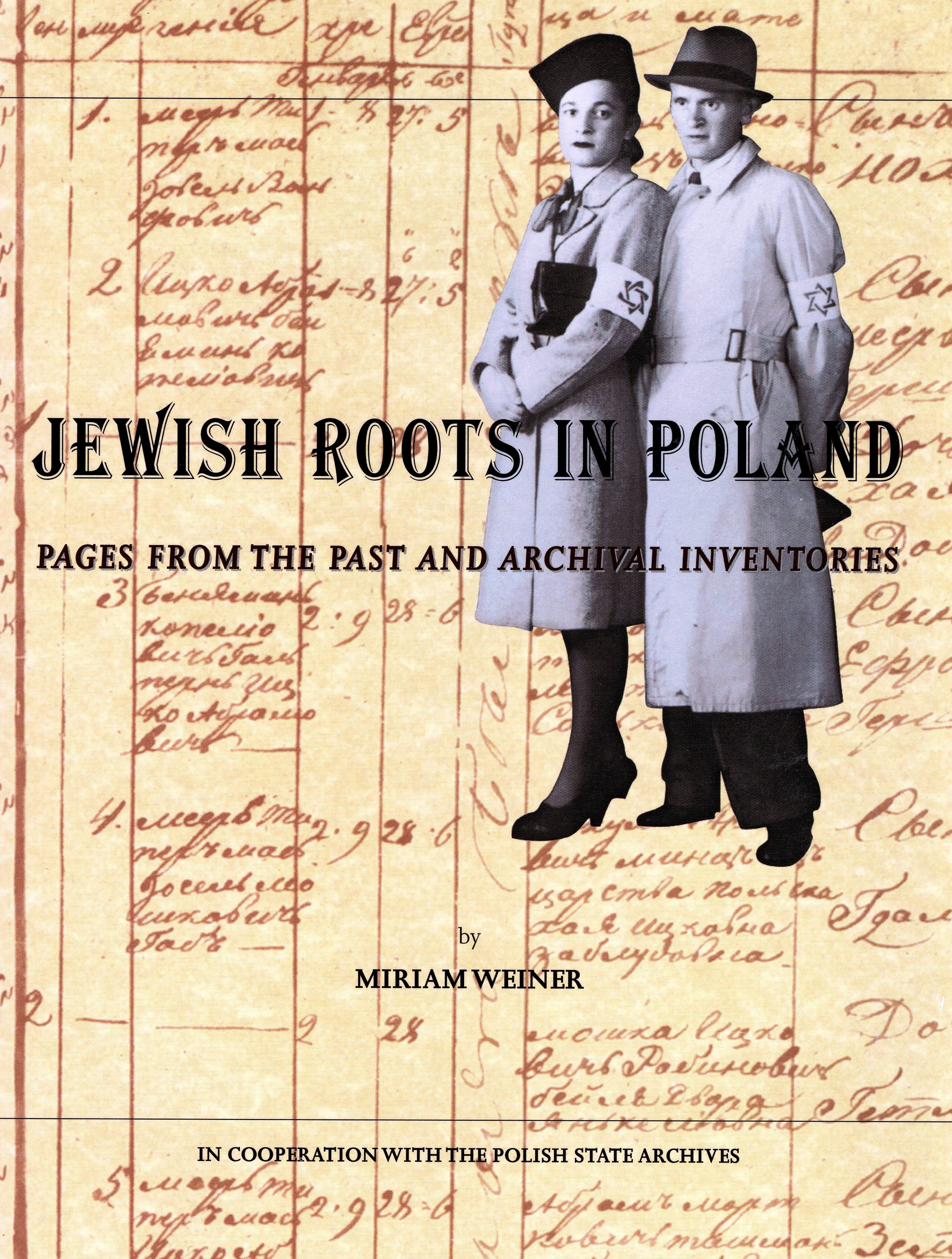
- Author: Miriam Weiner
- Language: English
- Genre: Genealogy
- Publisher: Miriam Weiner Routes to Roots Foundation, YIVO Institute for Jewish Research
- Publication date: 1997
- Publication place: United States
- Media type: Print (hardcover)
- Pages: 446
- ISBN: 978-0-965-65080-9
- OCLC: 38756480
- Dewey Decimal: 929.3438088296/e21/
- LC Class: DS135.P6 W37 1997
- Followed by: Jewish Roots in Ukraine and Moldova
- Website: RTRFoundation.org

Jewish Roots in Poland: Pages from the Past and Archival Inventories is a book created by genealogist Miriam Weiner and co-published by The Miriam Weiner Routes to Roots Foundation and YIVO Institute for Jewish Research. A searchable database of updated archival holdings listed in the book is available in the Archive Database on the Routes to Roots Foundation website.

== Overview ==
In 1997, in official cooperation with the Polish State Archives (Naczelna Dyrekcja Archiwów Państwowych in Warsaw, Poland), Weiner authored and published the book, Jewish Roots in Poland. The book includes archival holdings of the Polish State Archives, the Jewish Historical Institute in Warsaw, local town hall documents throughout Poland, Holocaust documents found in the archives of the death camps located in Auschwitz near Kraków and Majdanek near Lublin. The book also features document examples, maps, antique postcards depicting towns and daily life, and modern-day photographs. There are individual town listings for localities with more than 10,000 Jews in 1939.

Jewish Roots in Poland took over ten years to complete. The book includes an inventory of 1,250 towns and over 5,000 record entries for these towns. Sources of the material were the Polish State Archives (which included 75 archives throughout Poland), Urzad Stanu Cywilnego (which included 434 offices throughout Poland), and the Jewish Historical Institute in Warsaw. Holocaust documents came from the Majdanek Museum Archives and Auschwitz-Birkenau Museum Archives. There are over 300 color photos and over 200 black and white photos of 127 towns, 52 document examples, and 14 color maps.

== Reception ==
Jewish Roots in Poland was the first work of its kind, as it collected details on archival documents from Poland and the former Soviet Union that had previously been deemed inaccessible or fundamentally lost. The book also serves multiple functions, so its diversity of offerings often made categorizing what the book was difficult. It is a combination of genealogical resources and Holocaust references as well as a coffee table book. Weiner's book can be categorized thusly: "It's a genealogy book; it's a Holocaust book; it's a coffee-table book; it's a scholarly reference book. It's also a travel book."

Warren Blatt from the JewishGen Kielce-Radom Special Interest Group (SIG) described the work as a tour de force and as a magum opus that is the most comprehensive work ever published on Polish-Jewish genealogy. He describes it as a work of great interest for genealogists, historians, travelers, or anyone interested in Polish-Jewish research. He further describes Weiner's book as a "lavishly illustrated volume" and states that "you'll want to display it as a coffee-table book, as well as mine the incredible depth of its comprehensive inventories and fantastic reference material for genealogical research." In a detailed analysis, Blatt found that the book provided information not previously available to genealogists. He concludes with "I love this book. I have enjoyed many hours with this indispensable volume, using it every day. It is truly a unique and timely masterpiece. This magnificent book belongs in the library of every serious Jewish genealogist." Marilyn Silverman of the Jewish Post of New York said Jewish Roots in Poland is the first Polish government-sanctioned book to document the holdings of the Polish State Archives that are of interest to Jewish genealogists. She sees the experience of discovering these documents as being both painful as well as inspiring a feeling of exhilaration, tied to survival.

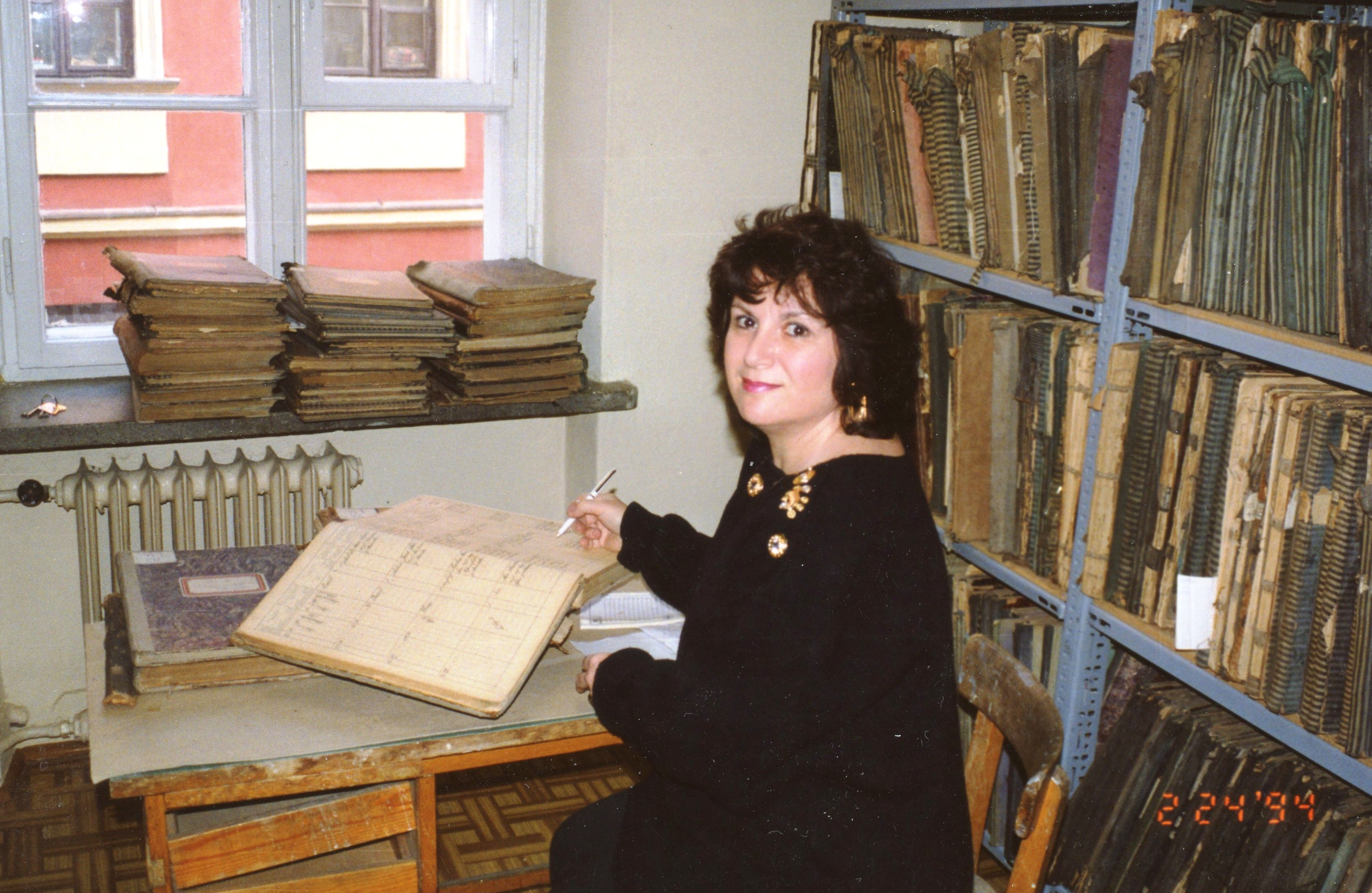
Miriam Weiner in Warsaw USC office in Poland working with Jewish vital record books from Galicia, 1994

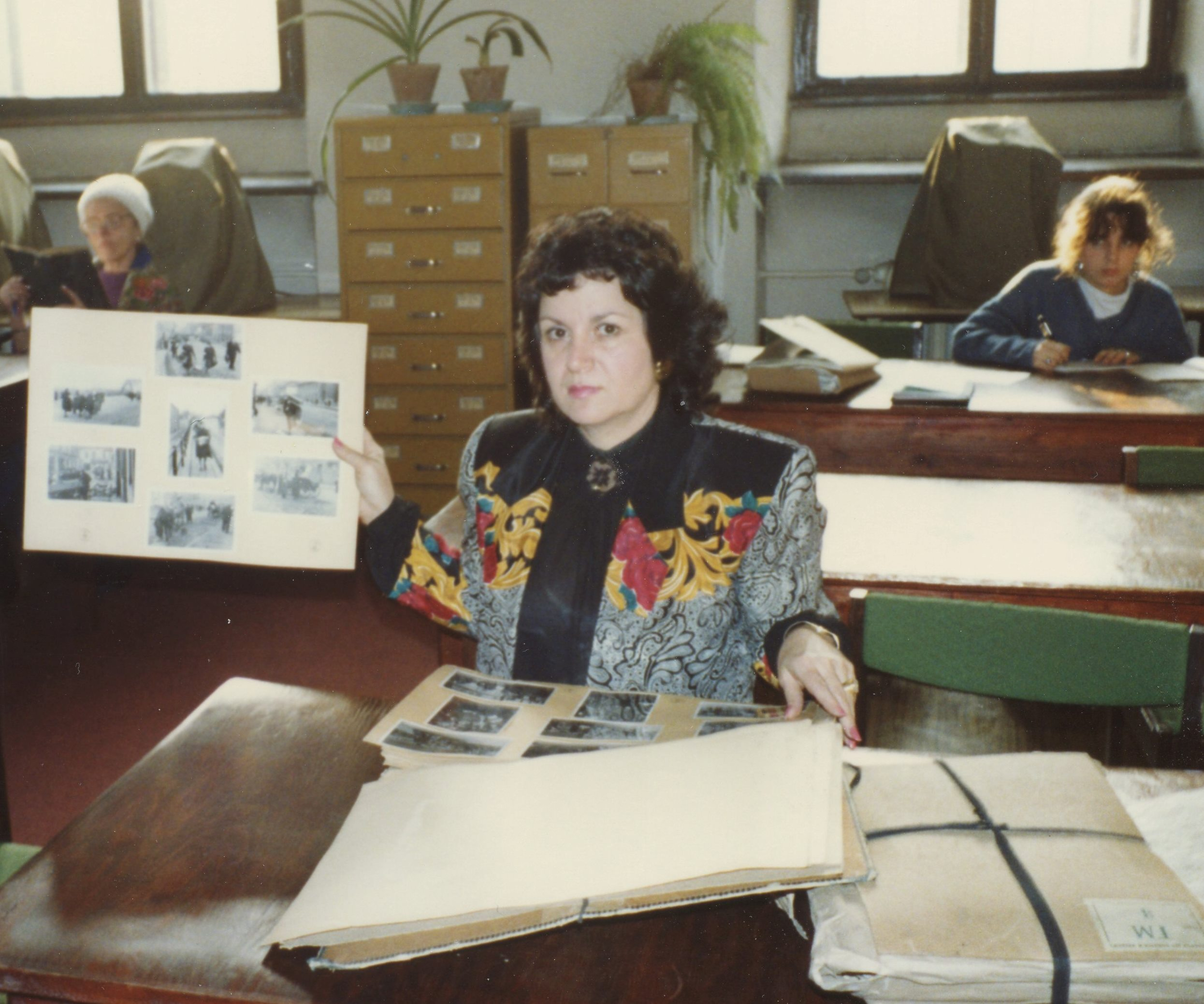
Miriam Weiner in the State Archive of Kraków (Poland) in the Reading Room looking at deportation photos taken during the Holocaust. Photo taken July 1990

In the New York Jewish Genealogical Society, Inc.'s publication, DOROT, their review called Jewish Roots in Poland Weiner's magnum opus, noting the genealogical holdings as well as the capsule town descriptions of 28 towns with large Jewish populations pre-WWII. The New York Times highlighted the book's importance as an information resource as well as the feelings of poignancy and nostalgia captured in the many images throughout the work.

The Forward described how Weiner was able to organize the original archival material – which lacked a town-by-town inventory and was uncatalogued and inaccessible for genealogical purposes – into a user-friendly format, with the data becoming accessible and organized.

== Awards ==
- 1999: International Association of Jewish Genealogical Societies, Outstanding Contribution via Print Award: Miriam Weiner for Jewish Roots in Poland
- 2000: Neographics, Best of Category: Reference Books/Directories to Routes to Roots Foundation

== Selected excerpts ==
Note: Jewish Roots in Poland is out of print. Miriam Weiner's non-profit Routes to Roots Foundation has made excerpts from the book available on the organization's website

- Skowronek, Jerzy (June 1996). Acknowledgements: Professor Jerzy Skowronek (PDF) (in English and Polish). Warsaw, Poland: Polish State Archives. pp. x–xi. ISBN 978-0-96-565080-9. OCLC 38756480.
- Nałęcz, Daria (June 1996). Acknowledgements: Dr. Daria Nałęcz, Director, Polish State Archives (Warsaw) (PDF) (in English and Polish). Warsaw, Poland: Polish State Archives. p. xii. ISBN 978-0-96-565080-9. OCLC 38756480.
- Olszewska, Urszula (June 1996). Acknowledgements: Urszula Olszewska, Director, Urzåd Stanu Cywilnego (Warszawa-Śródmieście) (PDF) (in English and Polish). Warsaw-Śródmieście, Poland: Urzåd Stanu Cywilnego. p. xiii. ISBN 978-0-96-565080-9. OCLC 38756480.
- Tych, Feliks (June 1996). Acknowledgements: Professor Feliks Tych, Director, Jewish Historical Institute (PDF) (in English and Polish). Warsaw, Poland: Jewish Historical Institute. p. xiv. ISBN 978-0-96-565080-9. OCLC 38756480.

== See also ==
- Jewish Roots in Ukraine and Moldova
- Israel–Poland relations
