= Meeds Lake =

Lake in the state of Minnesota, United States

- Location within Minnesota
- Location: Cook County, Minnesota
- Coordinates: 48°1′46″N 90°33′2″W
- Type: lake

Meeds Lake is a lake in Cook County, Minnesota, in the United States.

Meeds Lake was named for Alonzo Meeds, a state surveyor's assistant.

== See also ==
- List of lakes in Minnesota
