= Board for Certification of Genealogists =

The Board for Certification of Genealogists is a certifying body for genealogists founded in 1964 by Fellows of the American Society of Genealogists, the genealogical field's academic honorary society. The Board licenses associates under two categories: Certified Genealogist and Certified Genealogical Lecturer. Associates' licenses are granted for a five-year period, at which time they may be renewed upon application to the Board, and that application's evaluation in a peer-review process.

Associates holding certification work in a variety of fields. They have been recognized as experts in matters of inheritance and probate; some work to assist in reuniting families separated through adoption. Others prepare applications for lineage societies; still others work to prove Native American genealogies. Board-certified associates also provide leadership in an effort to raise standards for research, writing and reporting in the genealogical field.
