= Federation of Genealogical Societies =

American non-profit corporation

The Federation of Genealogical Societies (FGS) was a 501(c)(3) non-profit corporation founded in January 1976 and headquartered in Austin, Texas. FGS linked hundreds of U.S.-based genealogy societies and their members. FGS merged with the National Genealogical Society on 1 October 2020.

Prior to the merger, FGS published Forum magazine, filled with articles pertaining to society management and genealogical news. Additionally, FGS also published a series of "Society Strategy Papers", covering topics about effectively operating a genealogical society; as well as sponsoring an annual conference with four days of lectures, including one full day devoted to society management topics.

FGS also worked to preserve original resources of historical and genealogical significance. Among these projects were:

- Preserve the Pensions, a project to digitize War of 1812 pension files.
- The Civil War Soldiers and Sailors Database, a joint effort with the Genealogical Society of Utah and the National Park Service.
- The Malcolm H. Stern-NARA Gift Fund to fund the creation of finding aids and the microfilming of valuable research materials preserved in the National Archives and Records Administration (NARA) in Washington, D.C.
