= American Gathering of Jewish Holocaust Survivors and their Descendants =

Organization of Holocaust survivors and family

The American Gathering of Jewish Holocaust Survivors and Their Descendants, also known as the American Gathering, is the largest organization of Holocaust survivors in North America. It functions as an umbrella organization for survivor resources, offering both services and advocacy. The American Gathering is active in Holocaust remembrance, education and commemoration programs. From 1983 onwards, the organization has held national reunion events.

== History ==
Benjamin Meed and his wife Vladka Meed helped to organize the first World Gathering of Jewish Holocaust Survivors in Israel in June 1981. Inspired by the results of that event, the Meeds and other fellow Holocaust survivors subsequently established a North American organization called The American Gathering of Jewish Holocaust Survivors and Their Descendants. The American Gathering organized a reunion event for survivors that was held in Washington, D.C., in April 1983. The 1983 event was organized by Hirsch Altusky, Sam Bloch, Fred Diament, Roman Kent, Benjamin Meed, Ernest Michel, James Rapp, Norbert Wollheim and Solomon Zynstein. Over 20,000 survivors and their families attended this first event.

The initial focus of the organization was to hold national and local reunions of survivors and their families and to combat isolation that survivors sometimes experienced, even within the wider Jewish community. The 1983 reunion was led by honorary chair, Elie Wiesel, with a speech given by President Ronald Reagan.

The American Gathering, located in New York City, is a member of other organizations such as the World Jewish Congress, the World Jewish Restitution Organization, the Jewish Community Relations Council and the Conference of Presidents of Major American Jewish Organizations. In that capacity, its mission is to use its moral authority to influence issues of importance to the survivor community and to the world Jewish community.

== Projects ==
=== Survivors Registry ===
The Benjamin and Vladka Meed Registry of Holocaust Survivors was established in 1981 to document the names of survivors who came to the Americas after World War II. It is the only registry of its kind. In 1993, it was moved to the United States Holocaust Memorial Museum (USHMM). In cooperation with the USHMM, the American Gathering continues to manage the database and to seek new registrants via its quarterly newspaper Together and its website, among other venues. The Registry includes over 200,000 records related to survivors and their families and is a resource for Holocaust historians and scholars, as well as families looking for lost relatives.

=== Holocaust and Jewish Resistance Teachers' Program ===
Initiated in 1984 by Vladka Meed and jointly administered by the American Gathering and the USHMM, the Holocaust and Jewish Resistance Teachers' Program is a two-week summer program for middle school and high school teachers, both Jewish and non-Jewish alike, on trips to Holocaust sites in Poland and to Israel. Participating scholars come from Yad Vashem in Jerusalem, the Study Center at Kibbutz Lohamei HaGeta'ot, and the USHMM in Washington, D.C., to speak with teachers selected for the program. A biannual Alumni Conference of the program's participants further reinforces its goals to foster remembrance and toleration.

=== Conference on Jewish Material Claims Against Germany ===
The American Gathering is on the board of directors of the Conference on Jewish Material Claims Against Germany, an organization that seeks restitution from the governments of Germany and Austria. The current negotiating committee is composed solely of survivors and chaired by the American Gathering's chairman Roman Kent, the restitution provides health care and assistance to survivors in desperate need.

=== Together ===
Founded in 1985, Together is the official publication of the American Gathering. With a circulation of approximately 85,000, it reflects the collective voice of survivors, the second and third generations, and includes news, opinions, information on education, commemorations, events, book reviews, announcements, searches, and articles on history and personal remembrance. Contributors include professional writers, poets, thinkers, historians, genealogists, and Holocaust scholars.

=== Community outreach ===
The American Gathering actively assists survivors on a daily basis. Whether it is through sitting on the Claims Conference, Self-Help Boards, manning an office to offer information, applications for assistance or interfacing with other related agencies on behalf of survivors, the American Gathering does its utmost to ensure that survivor issues are addressed.

=== National Holocaust commemorations and memorials ===
The collective and individual initiatives of the American Gathering leadership has fostered Holocaust commemoration, remembrance events and the establishment of Holocaust memorials in many communities throughout the United States and in almost every State House in the Union. While the American Gathering continues to sponsor its own annual commemoration program with the Museum of Jewish Heritage and WAGRO, it has been instrumental in the creation of the ongoing Holocaust programs at both the United Nations and the U.S. Congress.

== Works and publications ==
- American Gathering of Holocaust Survivors. From Holocaust to New Life: A Documentary Volume Depicting the Proceedings and Events of the American Gathering of Jewish Holocaust Survivors, Washington, D.C. April 1983 - Nissan 5743. New York: American Gathering of Holocaust Survivors, 1985. OCLC 15069152
- American Gathering of Jewish Holocaust Survivors. The Obligation to Remember The American Gathering of Jewish Holocaust Survivors, Washington D.C., April 11–14, 1983 : an Anthology. Washington, D.C.: The Washington Post, 1983. OCLC 705989208
- American Gathering of Jewish Holocaust Survivors. The Artist As Witness: Art by Survivors : the American Gathering Jewish Holocaust Survivors, April 11–14, 1983, Washington D.C. New York, N.Y.: American Gathering of Jewish Holocaust Survivors, 1983. OCLC 51579852
- American Gathering of Jewish Holocaust Survivors, and United States Holocaust Memorial Council. National Registry of Jewish Holocaust Survivors. New York: American Gathering of Jewish Holocaust Survivors in cooperation with the United States Holocaust Memorial Council, Washington, D.C., 1993. OCLC 30623812
- American Gathering of Jewish Holocaust Survivors. Together. New York: American Gathering of Jewish Holocaust Survivors, 1984. OCLC 13577224
