= Vladka Meed =

Jewish resistance fighter (1921–2012)

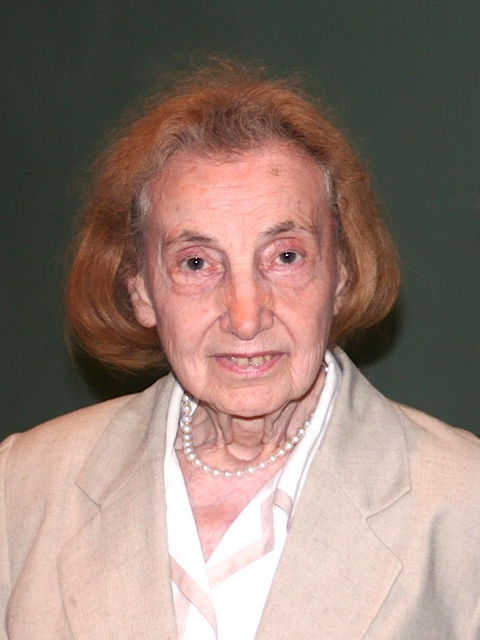
- Vladka Meed in 2005
- Born: Feigele Peltel; December 29, 1921; Warsaw, Poland
- Died: November 21, 2012 (aged 90); Paradise Valley, Arizona, U.S.
- Other name: Feigele Peltel Miedzyrzecki Feige Peltel
- Spouse: Benjamin Meed
- Children: 2

Vladka Meed (born Feigele Peltel, December 29, 1921 – November 21, 2012) was a member of Jewish resistance in Poland who famously smuggled dynamite into the Warsaw Ghetto, and also helped children escape out of the Ghetto.

== Early life ==
Meed was born in Praga, a district of Warsaw, Poland to Hanna Peltel (née Antosiewicz) and Shlomo Peltel. Her mother ran a haberdashery store, and her father worked in a leather factory. Meed was the oldest child; she had two siblings, sister Henia and brother Chaim.

At 14, she joined Jewish Labor Bund and in 1942 the Jewish Combat Organization. Vladka's father's died before and then her mother, brother, and sister died in Treblinka extermination camp. She was spared when they were taken because she worked in a German factory and had papers to show the Nazis when they raided her town. Vladka and her future husband Benjamin Meed pretended to be Aryans and helped organize the Warsaw Ghetto Uprising. After the final destruction of the Warsaw ghetto, Meed was active in the Jewish underground movement (the Jewish Coordinating Committee) which supported Jews to survive in Warsaw and its surroundings. Using a false identity, she traveled with forged permits to bring financial and emotional aid to hiding Jews, deliver fake documents, etc. Meed and Benjamin married in 1945 and survived both the Holocaust and World War II. They arrived in the US in 1946 with $8 between them.

== Career ==
In 1963, Vladka and her husband founded the Warsaw Ghetto Resistance Organization (WAGRO).

In 1981, she helped to organize the World Gathering of Jewish Holocaust Survivors in Jerusalem.

In 1983, the Meeds founded the American Gathering of Jewish Holocaust Survivors.

Vladka Meed's book "On Both Sides of the Wall" was originally published in Yiddish in 1948 with a first hand account of her wartime experiences. The book was translated into English in 1972 (with a foreword by Elie Wiesel), and later into German, Polish and Japanese. She also published in The Forward newspaper.

For nearly 20 years she organized a number of summer trips for teachers, educating them on the Holocaust, and the Jewish history of Warsaw. According to The New York Times obituary, she was a central source of the 2001 television film Uprising.

Meed received a 1973 award of the Warsaw Ghetto Resistance Organization, the 1989 Morim Award of the Jewish Teachers' Association, the 1993 Hadassah Henrietta Szold Award, and the 1995 Elie Wiesel Remembrance Award. She received an honorary degree from Hebrew Union College and Bar Ilan University.

== Personal life ==
The couple married shortly after the war, and in May 1946 they immigrated on the second boat, the Marine Flasher, that carried survivors to the United States. Meed's husband worked in the import-export business. They had two children, Steven and Anna, both of whom became physicians.

Meed died from Alzheimer's disease at her daughter's home in Paradise Valley, Arizona on November 21, 2012, at the age of 90.

== Works and publication ==
- Miedzyrzecki, Feigele Peltel. Fun Beyde Zaytn Geto-Moyer. New York: Farlag Workmen's Circle of the Educational Committee of the Workmen's Circle, 1948. (Yiddish original)
- Miedzyrzecki, Feigele Peltel. Fun beyde zaytn geto-moyer. Amherst: National Yiddish Book Center, 1999. OCLC 145734989 (Yiddish version, digitized)
- Miedzyrzecki, Feigele Peltel. On Both Sides of the Wall: Memoirs from the Warsaw Ghetto; Introduction by Elie Wiesel; [Translated by Moshe Spiegel and Steven Meed]. Lohame Ha-Getaot: Ghetto Fighters' House, 1977. ISBN 978-0-896-04012-0 OCLC 5723402 (English translation)
