= Benjamin Meed =

Holocaust survivor and member of Polish underground (1918–2006)

- Born: Benyomin Miedzyrzecki; February 19, 1918; Warsaw, Poland
- Died: October 24, 2006 (aged 88); New York City, New York US
- Occupations: President, American Gathering of Jewish Holocaust Survivors and their Descendants
- Spouse: Vladka Meed
- Children: 2

Benjamin Meed (born Benyomin Miedzyrzecki, February 19, 1918 – October 24, 2006), a Polish Jew, fought in the Warsaw Ghetto underground, served on the Advisory Board of the President's Commission on the Holocaust, planned the 1981 World Gathering of Jewish Holocaust Survivors and the 1983 American Gathering of Jewish Holocaust Survivors held in Washington, D.C., and other reunions that followed, and was President of the American Gathering of Jewish Holocaust Survivors and their Descendants.

== Early life ==
Meed was born in Warsaw, Poland to Israel Isaac and Rivka(nee Ribak) Miedzyrzecki. He had three siblings, an older sister Stella, a younger brother, Moti, and a younger sister Genia. The family followed a traditional existence, observing Shabbat and other Jewish practices. His father has a small thriving business trading leather.

== World War II ==
Meed was in a business high school when World War II erupted. Within a short time he was living in the Warsaw Ghetto and working as a slave laborer. Recruited into the underground by his future wife Vladka Meed (née Fayge Peltel), whom he met in the midst of the war, he was responsible for rescuing ghetto fighters and finding and building hiding places for them. Using their assumed names Czeslaw Pankiewicz (Ben) and Bronislawa "Vladka" Wa(n)chalska (Fayge), they were among those Jews on the "Aryan" side of the ghetto wall who distributed the April 23, 1943 appeal from the Jewish Fighting Organization. (Note: Meed had witnessed the beginning of the final Nazi incursion into the ghetto five days earlier. In a 1990 interview, he recalled unsympathetic residents reacting (“Jews are frying!”) as the ghetto burned.) About 1000 Jewish fighters held out for nearly 4 weeks. Benjamin and others living outside the walls witnessed the Warsaw Ghetto Uprising which ended April 29, 1943 with the burning of the ghetto. Having married after the war, Benjamin and Vlada emigrated to the United States in 1946. They settled in New York, changing their name to Meed as a way to blend into their new American life.

== Career ==
The Meeds helped plan the 1981 World Gathering of Jewish Holocaust Survivors held in Israel, the first event of its kind. People came from 23 different countries. Many of the people who came sought information on long lost family members and friends; in some cases they actually found them at the event. According to the LATimes, there were approximately 10,000 survivors and their extended families in attendance to this three day event which took place in Jerusalem, capital of Israel.

That same year, the organizers established the American Gathering of Jewish Holocaust Survivors to prepare for a 1983 gathering in Washington, D.C., which attracted 20,000 survivors and their families. Meed was able to convince the Capital Centre to waive the fees for use of the facilities, but they were told that the payments to the union employees who work the venue would not be included in the waiver. After the event, the union employees, after witnessing the connections of survivors at the event, said that they also waived the charge for their services.

Soon after its founding, the American Gathering established a Registry of Jewish Holocaust Survivors, the a database of survivors and their families. The Registry now contains information on approximately 195,000 survivors and their families worldwide. The Benjamin and Vladka Meed Registry of Jewish Holocaust Survivors is housed at the Museum and has become an important tool for families and researchers.

He was also deeply committed to teacher training, as he and Mrs. Meed, through the American Gathering and the Jewish Labor Committee, created the "Summer Seminar Program on Holocaust and Jewish Resistance."

Meed served on the Advisory Board of the President's Commission on the Holocaust, which recommended the United States Holocaust Memorial Museum's establishment. He also served on the United States Holocaust Memorial Council, the Museum's governing body, from 1980 to 2004, where he chaired several crucial committees: the Days of Remembrance Committee and the Museum Content Committee, which oversaw the creation of the Museum's Permanent Exhibition. He was responsible for institutionalizing Holocaust commemorations in the nation's capital, at state houses and cities across the country, and at military installations worldwide.

In November 2003, in honor of the Museum's 10th anniversary, Mr. Meed conceived "A Tribute to Holocaust Survivors: A Reunion of a Special Family," which honored survivors, liberators and rescuers as well as their families. More than 7,000 people, four generations strong, traveled to Washington from 38 states and around the world to take part in the largest Museum event since its opening.

Mr. Meed served as president of the American Gathering from its inception until his death.

== Personal life ==
The couple married shortly after the war, and in May 1946 they immigrated on the second boat, the Marine Flasher, that carried survivors to the United States. Meed worked in the import-export business. They had two children, Steven and Anna, both of whom became physicians.

== Death ==
Benjamin died in New York after a long illness on October 25th, 2006 at the age of 88. He was survived by his wife Vlada, his children Steven Meed of Manhattan and Anna Scherzer of Paradise Valley, Ariz.; a sister, Genia Reznic of Tel Aviv; and five grandchildren.

Meed left behind a legacy not only as a Holocaust survivor, but as the founder of the United States Holocaust Memorial Museum. “We must tell our story to be worthy of the memory of our six million martyrs who cannot speak for themselves,” he stated.

Arthur Berger, a senior advisor to the Washington museum, said that Meed did not only leave “an enormous gift to survivors, but to the entire world.”

== See also ==
- American Gathering of Jewish Holocaust Survivors and their Descendants
