= Rod Coutts =

Canadian electrical engineer and entrepreneur

Rod (J. Roderick) Coutts is a Canadian entrepreneur and a co-founder of Teklogix International. He was born in Cookstown, Ontario. Coutts graduated from University of Waterloo in 1964 with a Bachelor of Applied Science Degree in Electrical Engineering.
In 2000, Coutts donated an estimated $7 million in shares to the University of Waterloo, as his tribute to the school.

"My family has had a lot of good fortune over the years and the University of Waterloo had a lot to do with that," says Coutts. "This is my chance to give something back."

In return for his generosity, the University has named a building after him: J.R. Coutts Engineering Lecture Hall (commonly referred to as Rod Coutts Hall, or RCH). Since then, Coutts has continued supporting the university by funding bursaries and scholarships.

In 2007, Rod Coutts received his Doctor of Engineering (D.Eng.'07).

== Teklogix ==
Coutts was the founder of Teklogix International with four other young entrepreneurs: Lawrie Cragg, Al Vanderburgh, Cliff Bernard and Pete Halsall. The company focused on providing mobile workers with Wireless data transmission and real-time data management within the logistics industry. Teklogix became Psion Teklogix in the year 2000, after it was purchased for $544 million (Cdn.) by U.K.-based Psion, started by David Potter.

Coutts met the other Teklogix founders while working at Ferranti International's Canadian division, Ferranti-Packard Electronics. Ferranti-Packard was known for projects related to FP6000 (Ferranti-Packard 6000, which became the ICL 1900), ReserVec, Back Up Interceptor Control (BUIC) for the United States Military, as well as Ferranti-Packard's drum memory systems. He worked closely on drum memory associated with the early warning radar system for North America. Coutts and the rest of the founding group left Ferranti-Packard and formed Teklogix in 1967.

== See also ==
- Semi Automatic Ground Environment (SAGE)
- List of University of Waterloo people
