= Kenyon Taylor =

English electrical engineer and inventor

Maurice Kenyon Taylor (26 June 1908 – 29 June 1986) was an English electrical engineer and inventor, responsible for many diverse technological developments and inventions, producing over 70 patents during his career. He spent most of his career at Ferranti, first in Manchester, then Edinburgh and finally moving to Canada where he led development at their Toronto-area operations, Ferranti-Packard.

== Early life ==
Taylor was born near Balloch, Scotland to English parents; the son of Maurice Grove Taylor. He was educated at Oundle Public school and passed the entrance exam to King's College, Cambridge, where he studied for a year before moving to Manchester University.

== Ferranti Manchester ==
Kenyon Taylor came to the attention of Albert Hall who was the personal assistant of Sebastian Ziani de Ferranti of the Ferranti company Manchester and joined them as a lab boy in March 1931. For some time, Ferranti had been contracted by J P Coats of Paisley to develop a very high speed cotton doubling frame but had been plagued for years with problems relating to the dynamic balance of tubular flyers. Working together with Dr Vincent Ferranti, Taylor eventually produced a solution described in his first British Patent 399,845.

In the mid 1920s in order to produce their own valves (vacuum tubes) and to keep pace with the rapid expansion in radio technology, Ferranti had begun expanding their radio business at Stalybridge One of Taylor's early contributions to this effort was a diode pentode valve (tube) for use in radio receivers described in patent GB 412,693 which was sold to the Patent pool. Hall and Taylor also produced and patented a system for improving the treble tone or sound of a radio with a novel adjustable filtering system. As well as working on radio, around 1933 Ferranti started to take an interest in Mechanical television and Taylor played a significant part in its development too. When Ferranti purchased shares in the Scophony company he produced a light source for the Scophony system and a method to lock the picture to the transmitter.

In 1934 during the manufacture of radio components, Taylor together with Arthur Chilcot produced and patented a cathode ray tuning indicator often referred to as a Magic Eye. Taylor was involved in the manufacture of cathode ray tubes and here he had several patents concerning electronic improvements and methods to apply the screen coatings. As well as making improvements to the focusing of these crts, he also patented a method of connecting them with a video signal.

By 1935 Ferranti had acquired bigger premises at Moston and when Dr Vincent Ferranti employed Dr N H Searby as their Chief engineer, Taylor became their chief research engineer. In the mid 1930s the future of television broadcasting was decided by a committee set up by the British government 405 TV Trials. Dr Vincent Ferranti and Hall were called to the committee along with other television manufacturers to give their input. They argued for the case of keeping low definition TV in the north of England as they knew it would be a long time before high definition (405 TV) would become available outside London. However, the outcome was mechanical television of the Baird type was rejected in favour of an all-electronic system demonstrated by Marconi-EMI.

In 1936 Dr Searby employed an Oxford graduate Hubert Wood who worked with Taylor on radio and television, but in the buildup to WW2, television development was put aside as they were assigned to work on a team developing IFF headed by F.C. Williams a scientist at TRE Bawdsey, in conjunction with James Rennie Whitehead. Several patents followed from this work and Hubert Wood refined the IFF Mark III seeing it into commercial production after the war. During the war food was important and Taylor produced a novel method of fast drying seeds or grain for which he obtained a patent with Frank Humber.

=== Ferranti Scotland ===
In 1945 Taylor was requested by Sir John Toothill to set up an electronics research laboratory in Edinburgh which attracted the likes of D T N Williamson, who, although better known for his amplifier fame was responsible with Taylor and others for many aircraft navigation developments. Taylor spent around five years here and worked on, and patented, an early form of Xerography before leaving to start a research laboratory in Canada.

=== Ferranti-Canada ===
The laboratory in Scotland was successful and Taylor was invited by Toothill to set up an electronics laboratory at Ferranti Canada, which later merged with Packard, becoming Ferranti-Packard. Taylor took some members from the UK with him but also employed many local talented individuals, who would eventually produce DATAR headed up by British Scientist Dr Arthur Porter. Although DATAR wasn't without its difficulties, Tom Cranston, Fred Longstaff and Taylor developed and built a Trackball as part of the display system.

After DATAR funding ceased Arthur Porter left for an academic position, leaving Taylor the stressful job of finding work to keep their engineers usefully employed. Times ahead were tough, but Taylor still managed patents relating to letter sorting machines and an air bearing drum for use with the world's first computerised airline reservation system, ReserVec for Air Canada. During the 1960s Taylor worked on vehicle detection for road traffic management with Frank Paine and A.L. Stelmach.

Vardalas explains in some detail that in the 1960s Taylor had an idea that superconductors would be useful for power companies in reducing power losses associated with electricity generation and employed Dr David Atherton to commence research on this. It eventually became clear that the funding required to take this research from small scale laboratory experiments to commercial development would put Ferranti Packard out of their depth and much of this research didn't translate into commercial success.

Vardalas goes on to suggest that Display Technology saved the day when Taylor came up with the idea of displaying information by means of a fixed array of dots, by way of a Flip-disc-display these were used in the stock exchanges and airports around the world. Taylor and Donald Winrow both made massive contributions with several patents as the principal idea evolved.
