= Ferranti Orion =

Type of mainframe computer

The Orion was a mid-range mainframe computer introduced by Ferranti in 1959 and installed for the first time in 1961. Ferranti positioned Orion to be their primary offering during the early 1960s, complementing their high-end Atlas and smaller systems like the Sirius and Argus. The Orion was based on a new type of logic circuit known as "Neuron" and included built-in multitasking support, one of the earliest commercial machines to do so (the KDF9 being a contemporary).

Performance of the system was much less than expected and the Orion was a business disaster, selling only about eleven machines. The Orion 2 project was quickly started to address its problems, and five of these were sold. Its failure was the capstone to a long series of losses for the Manchester labs, and with it, Ferranti management grew tired of the entire computer market. The division was sold to International Computers and Tabulators (ICT), who selected the Canadian Ferranti-Packard 6000 as their mid-range offering, ending further sales of the Orion 2.

== History ==
=== Magnetic amplifiers ===
During the 1950s transistors were expensive and relatively fragile devices. Although they had advantages for computer designers, namely lower power requirements and their smaller physical packaging, vacuum tubes remained the primary logic device until the early 1960s. There was no lack of experimentation with other solid state switching devices, however.

One such system was the magnetic amplifier. Similar to magnetic core memory, or "cores", magnetic amplifiers used small toroids of ferrite as a switching element. When current passed through the core, a magnetic field would be induced that would reach a maximum value based on the saturation point of the material being used. This field induced a current in a separate read circuit, creating an amplified output with a known current. Unlike digital logic based on tubes or transistors, which uses defined voltages to represent values, magnetic amplifiers based their logic values on defined current values.

One advantage to magnetic amplifiers is that they are open in the center and several input lines can be threaded through them. This makes it easy to implement chains of "OR" logic by threading a single core with all the inputs that need to be ORed together. This was widely used in the "best two out of three" circuits that were used in binary adders, which could reduce the component count of the ALU considerably. This was known as "Ballot Box Logic" due to the way the inputs "voted" on the output. Another way to use this feature was to use the same cores for different duties during different periods of the machine cycle, say to load memory during one portion and then as part of an adder in another. Each of the cores could be used for as many duties as there was room for wiring through the center.

In the late 1950s new techniques were introduced in transistor manufacture that led to a rapid fall in prices while reliability shot up. By the early 1960s most magnetic amplifier efforts were abandoned. Few machines using the circuits reached the market, the best known examples being the mostly-magnetic UNIVAC Solid State (1959) and the mostly transistorized English Electric KDF9 (1964).

=== Neuron ===
The Ferranti Computer Department in West Gorton, Manchester had originally been set up as an industrial partner of Manchester University's pioneering computer research lab, commercializing their Manchester Mark 1 and several follow-on designs. During the 1950s, under the direction of Brian Pollard, the Gorton labs also researched magnetic amplifiers. Like most teams, they decided to abandon them when transistors improved.

One member of the lab, Ken Johnson, proposed a new type of transistor-based logic that followed the same conventions as the magnetic amplifiers, namely that binary logic was based on known currents instead of voltages. Like the magnetic amplifiers, Johnson's "Neuron" design could be used to control several different inputs. Better yet, the system often required only one transistor per logic element, whereas conventional voltage-based logic would require two or more. Although transistors were falling in price they were still expensive, so a Neuron-based machine might offer similar performance at a much lower price than a machine based on traditional transistor logic.

The team decided to test the Neuron design by building a small machine known as "Newt", short for "Neuron test". This machine was so successful that the lab decided to expand the testbed into a complete computer. The result was the Sirius, which was announced on 19 May 1959 with claims that it was the smallest and most economically priced computer in the European market. Several sales followed.

=== Orion 1 ===
With the success of Sirius, the team turned its attention to a much larger design. Since many of the costs of a complete computer system are fixed – power supplies, printers, etc. – a more complex computer with more internal circuitry would have more of its cost associated with the circuits themselves. For this reason, a larger machine made of Neurons would have an increased price advantage over transistorized offerings. Pollard decided that such a machine would be a strong counterpart to the high-end Atlas, and would form the basis for Ferranti's sales for the next five years.

Looking for a launch customer, Ferranti signed up Prudential Assurance with the promise to deliver the machine in 1960. However, these plans quickly went awry. The Neuron proved unable to be adapted to the larger physical size of the Orion. Keeping the current levels steady over the longer wire runs was extremely difficult, and efforts to cure the problems resulted in lengthy delays. The first Orion was eventually delivered, but was over a year late and unit cost was more than expected, limiting its sales. Between 1962 and 1964 the Computing Division lost $7.5 million, largely as a result of the Orion.

=== Orion 2 ===
During the Orion's gestation it appeared there was a real possibility the new system might not work at all. Engineers at other Ferranti departments, notably the former Lily Hill House in Bracknell, started raising increasingly vocal concerns about the effort. Several members from Bracknell approached Gordon Scarrott and tried to convince him that Orion should be developed using a conventional all-transistor design. They recommended using the "Griblons" circuits developed by Maurice Gribble at Ferranti's Wythenshawe plant, which they had used to successfully implement their Argus computer for the Bristol Bloodhound missile system. Their efforts failed, they turned to Pollard to overrule Scarrott, which led to a series of increasingly acrimonious exchanges. After their last attempt on 5 November 1958, they decided to go directly to Sebastian de Ferranti, but this effort also failed.

Pollard resigned about a month later and his position was taken over by Peter Hall. Braunholtz later expressed his frustration that they didn't write to him directly, and the matter sat for several years while Orion continued to run into delays. In September 1961 Prudential was threatening to cancel their order, and by chance, Braunholtz at that moment sent a telegram to Hall expressing his continuing concerns. Hall immediately invited Braunholtz to talk about his ideas, and several days later the Bracknell team was working full out on what would become the Orion 2.

By the end of October the basic design was complete, and the team started looking for a transistor logic design to use for implementation. Although Braunholtz had suggested using the Griblons, the Bracknell group also invited a team of engineers from Ferranti Canada to discuss their recent successes with their "Gemini" design, which was used in their ReserVec system. On November 2 the Bracknell team decided to adopt the Gemini circuitry for Orion 2.

Parts arrived from many Ferranti divisions over the next year, and the machine was officially switched on by Peter Hunt on 7 January 1963. The first Orion 2 was delivered to Prudential on 1 December 1964, running at about five times the speed of the Orion 1. Prudential bought a second machine for the processing of industrial branch policies. Another system was sold to the South African Mutual Life Assurance Society in Cape Town where it was used for updating insurance policies. A fourth was sold to Beecham Group to upgrade its Orion 1 system. The original prototype was kept by ICT and used for software development by the Nebula Compiler team.

By this point, however, Ferranti was already well on the road to selling all of its business computing divisions to ICT. As part of their due diligence process, ICT studied both the Orion 2 and the FP-6000. Ferranti's own engineers concluded that "There are certain facets of the system we do not like. However, were we to begin designing now a machine in the same price/performance range as the FP6000, we would have in some 18 months' time a system that would not be significantly better – if indeed any better – than the FP6000." ICT chose to move forward with the FP-6000 with minor modifications, and used it as the basis for their ICT 1900 series through the 1960s. Existing contracts for the Orion 2 were filled, and sales ended.

== Description ==
Although the Orion and Orion 2 differed significantly in their internals, their programming interface and external peripherals were almost identical.

The basic Orion machine included 4,096 48-bit words of slow, 12μs, core memory, which could be expanded to 16,384 words. Each word could be organized as eight 6-bit characters, a single 48-bit binary number, or a single floating-point number with a 40-bit mantissa and an 8-bit exponent. The system included built-in capabilities for working with pounds sterling before decimalization. The core memory was backed by one or two magnetic drums with 16k words each. Various offline input/output included magnetic disks, tape drives, punched cards, punched tape and printers.

Most of the Orion's instruction set used a three-address form, with sixty-four 48-bit accumulators. Each program had its own private accumulator set which were the first 64 registers of its address space, which was a reserved contiguous subset of the physical store, defined by the contents of a "datum" relocation register. Operand addresses were relative to the datum, and could be modified by one of the accumulators for indexing arrays and similar tasks. A basic three-address instruction took a minimum of 64 μs, a two-address one 48 μs, and any index modifications on the addresses added 16 μs per modified address. Multiplication took from 156 to 172 μs, and division anywhere from 564 to 1,112 μs, although the average time was 574 μs. The Orion 2, having a core store with a much shorter cycle time, was considerably faster.

A key feature of the Orion system was its built-in support for time-sharing. This was supported by a series of input/output (I/O) interrupts, or what they referred to as "lockouts". The system automatically switched programs during the time spent waiting for the end of an I/O operation. The Orion also supported protected memory in the form of pre-arranged "reservations". Starting and stopping programs, as well as selecting new ones to run when one completed, was the duty of the "Organisation Program." The Orion was one of the earliest machines to directly support time-sharing in hardware in spite of intense industry interest; other time-sharing systems of the same era include LEO III of 1961, PLATO in early 1961, CTSS later that year, and the English Electric KDF9 and FP-6000 of 1964.

The Orion is also notable for the use of its own high-level business language, NEBULA. Nebula was created because of Ferranti's perception that the COBOL standard of 1960 was not sufficiently powerful for their machines, notably as COBOL was developed in the context of decimal, character-oriented batch processing, while Orion was a binary word-oriented multiprogramming system. NEBULA adapted many of COBOL's basic concepts, adding new ones of their own. NEBULA was later ported to the Atlas as well.
