= Mops =

Mops or MOPS may refer to:

- MOPS, a buffer in protein chemistry
- Mops (bat), a genus of free-tailed bat
- The Mops, a Japanese rock group
- Mean of Platts Singapore, a measure of fuel oil pricing in Singapore
- Memory operations per second, a performance capacity of semiconductor memory
- MOPS International, a parenting organization
- Socialist Workers Party (Mandatory Palestine) (Hebrew: מפ״ס, romanized: Mops)
- Minimum operational performance standards; see Type certificate
- Name for the Pug dog breed in certain languages

== See also ==
- MOP (disambiguation)
- Moppy
- Micro-operation (μops)
- Weighted million operations per second (WMOPS), see Instructions per second
