= Teklogix =

Teklogix International
- Type: Public
- Industry: Technology, Wireless Real-Time Data Capture, Computers, Automation, Emulators
- Founded: 1967
- Founder: Rod Coutts, Lawrie Cragg, Al Vanderburgh, Cliff Bernard and Pete Halsall
- Successor: Psion Teklogix
- Headquarters: Mississauga, Ontario, Canada
- Key people: Rod Coutts, Lawrie Cragg, Al Vanderburgh, Cliff Bernard and Pete Halsall
- Services: Automation, Wireless Real-Time Data Capture
- Website: www.teklogix.com
- Footnotes (Website is redirected to www.zebra.com)

Teklogix International Inc., or Teklogix, was a tech company founded in 1967 by engineers working at Ferranti-Packard. The company focused on mini computer applications. It designed and built complete systems based upon DEC's PDP-8 computer, DEC's logic modules and purpose built logic. Many of the company's projects involved control of material handling systems and this led to the development of radio linked terminals for installation on fork lift trucks complete with multiplexers to interface to a variety of main frame computer systems.

In September 2000 Teklogix was acquired by U.K.-based Psion PLC, and became Psion Teklogix Inc.

== Founders ==
The founders are: Rod Coutts, Lawrie Cragg, Al Vanderburgh, Cliff Bernard and Pete Halsall. Lawrie Cragg ran the company as president for the first nine years of its life.
The group met while working at Ferranti International's Canadian division, Ferranti-Packard Electronics. The engineers worked on projects related to FP6000 (Ferranti-Packard 6000, which became the ICL 1900), ReserVec, Back Up Interceptor Control (BUIC) for the United States Military, as well as Ferranti-Packard's drum memory systems. The group left Ferranti-Packard and formed Teklogix.

- The founding members managed to collect $10,000 in initial subscribed capital, with an additional $8,000 provided by Pete Halsall, when he was made a full partner in the early 70's.
- In the year 2000, the company was purchased by Psion for £240 million, or $544 million (CDN).

== History ==
On September 20, 1967, Teklogix was formed by a group of five engineers. The first contract came from I. P. Sharp Associates (another Ferranti offspring) that involved the interface of a DEC PDP-8 computer to an X-ray spectrometer. The system controlled reagent feeders in a copper and zinc flotation mill. The objective was to analyze the mine head (i.e. what was coming out of the mine) using on-line X-ray spectroscopy and, then, using mathematical algorithms developed by University of Toronto, add the appropriate amounts of reagent to optimize mineral recovery.

In 1972, Teklogix was awarded a contract from Canada Post to control a tilt-tray mail sorter system. The company went on to be a primary supplier of sortation and conveyor control systems for the next decade.

In 1980, Teklogix introduced wireless real-time data collection solutions.

In 1981, the company was awarded a contract with U.S. Defense General Supply Agency (DGSC) to develop a real-time on-board pick information system for 37 Raymond pick vehicles. The next few years attracted more high-profile clients, such as General Motors, Digital Equipment Corp., General Dynamics, Avon and Owens Corning.

1988 - Teklogix opened its first U.S. office in Florence, Kentucky.
1992 - Teklogix was expanded to Europe and Pacific Rim. In the summer of 1992, Teklogix produced its 10,000th terminal.
1993 - An executive, principal engineers, and several other Teklogix employees resign and start a competing company, WaveLink Technologies, which is subsequently bought by Amtech Corp. of Dallas, Texas.
1994 - Teklogix launches a $7.8 million lawsuit against WaveLink and Amtech for improper use of confidential information, theft of technology, and misappropriation of business opportunities.
1995 - Teklogix announced its IPO on the Toronto Stock Exchange.
1996 - In June, Teklogix has relocated its office to the current Psion Teklogix corporate office, in Mississauga, Ontario, Canada. Teklogix was expanded to South America through the opening of 4 offices in Mexico DF, São Paulo, Santiago de Chile and Buenos AIres.
1997 - Company acquired Badger Mobile Computing.
2000 - In September 2000 Teklogix was acquired by U.K.-based Psion PLC, and became Psion Teklogix Inc.
2011 - Psion has shortened its operating company name, removing the name “Teklogix”.
2012 - Psion was acquired by Motorola Solutions on Oct. 1, 2012.
2014 - In October, Zebra Technologies acquired Motorola Solutions' Enterprise business which included Symbol Technologies and Psion for $3.45 billion in cash.
