= Ferranti-Packard 6000 =

Type of mainframe computer

The FP-6000 was a second-generation mainframe computer developed and built by Ferranti-Packard, the Canadian division of Ferranti, in the early 1960s. It is particularly notable for supporting multitasking, being one of the first commercial machines to do so. Only six FP-6000s were sold before the computer division of Ferranti-Packard was sold off by Ferranti's UK headquarters in 1963, the FP-6000 becoming the basis for the mid-range machines of the ICT 1900, which sold into the thousands in Europe.

== Background ==
What was to become the FP-6000 had its genesis in a Royal Canadian Navy project starting in 1949 called DATAR. For DATAR, Ferranti-Packard (then still known as Ferranti Canada) built an experimental computer to share information among ships in a convoy. Although the prototype was a success, the failure rate of the vacuum tubes was a concern to everyone and Ferranti suggested they re-build the machine using transistors instead. DATAR ran out of funds before this conversion could take place, but Ferranti put the experience to good use in a series of one-off transistorized machines. One such example was a cheque sorting system built for the Federal Reserve Bank, itself a modification of a system developed to sort mail for the Canadian Post Office.

The developmental series eventually culminated in ReserVec. ReserVec was the first computerized reservation system to enter service when it took over all bookings for Air Canada in 1961. Ferranti initially had high hopes for the machine, thinking that it would be successful in Europe if sold by the UK headquarters' sales staff. As had happened many times in the past, however, the UK computer team suffered from a terminal case of not invented here, and decided it was better if they designed their own instead. Their project was never delivered, and ReserVec withered.

Ferranti-Packard was unwilling to simply let the development effort go to waste, and started looking for ways to commercialize the ReserVec hardware into a general purpose mainframe. Ferranti-Packard needed a launch customer to ensure at least one sale, and approached the Federal Reserve Bank again, offering a greatly expanded and more flexible system to replace the earlier custom-wired machine they had delivered only a few years earlier in 1958.

== Concept ==
During the late 1950s, Ferranti's UK computer development department was heavily involved in the development of computer circuitry based on the use of magnetic amplifiers. These were a 1950s replacement for transistors; at that time transistors were extremely expensive and still had reliability issues. Magnetic amplifiers were larger than transistors but had the advantage of allowing a single amplifier to be shared among several circuits, lowering component counts. When newer transistors were introduced at lower price points, interest in magnetic amplifiers disappeared almost overnight.

Ken Johnson, an engineer at Ferranti's computer division in Manchester, noticed that it would be possible to wire these new transistors in the same way as the magnetic amplifiers, thereby reusing a single transistor for several tasks, and in turn, greatly lowering component costs. It appeared this concept, which he called "neuron" due to its multi-input/multi-output wiring being similar to the brain's neurons, would allow Ferranti to build computers at lower price points than their competition.

To test the concept, they build a small test machine known as "Newt". This was successful, and in 1959 the company introduced two commercial machines based on neuron, one for the low-end and another midrange design. In 1960, the smaller design was delivered as the Ferranti Sirius, a desk-sized system for small businesses. It was an immediate success, undercutting the price of any similar design. The larger machine, the Ferranti Orion, was developed in parallel and formally announced in 1960 with the first unit shipping in 1961. A number of engineers from the Canadian office were sent to the UK to work on this machine.

Orion ultimately demonstrated that the neuron concept simply didn't work at larger sizes, the electrical current needed to activate the switching was high enough that when pushed through the long wires of a large machine they produced noise in the circuits and no solution could be found to eliminate it. Orion was being positioned as Ferranti's main offering for the 1960s, and its failure threw the company's computer division into disarray.

While this was taking place, a separate group within Ferranti was formed to consider a replacement for the successful tube-based Ferranti Pegasus. These efforts resulted in an autumn 1961 specification sometimes known as "Harriac" after the study group's manager, Harry Johnson. Harriac was essentially a transistorized Pegasus with more modern features, and as such, it would have fit into Ferranti's product line at about the same level as the Orion. After considerable internal debate, the company decided to produce a transistorized version of Orion, Orion 2, and Harriac was forgotten.

As the Orion project broke down, the Canadian contingent returned to Canada and took Harriac with them. They decided to combine the Harriac specification with their own successful transistorized circuitry developed for ReserVec.

== Design ==
A key feature of the Orion was what was then known as "multiprogramming", the ability to run multiple programs at once, rapidly switching between them to make it appear as if they were all running at the same time. The key problem in supporting multiprogramming was the need for programs to be loaded into different locations in memory. Without multiprogramming support, a program was normally loaded into the "base" of memory, its notional location zero. To provide the illusion of being at zero, in a multiprogramming machine each program was assigned a fixed amount of the core memory, its base location is known as the datum and the last location as the limit. Every store operation by the CPU automatically offset the effective address by the datum for that program.

In order to prevent fragmentation of memory, every time a program terminated, the FP-6000's operating system, known as Executive, would temporarily stop the other programs and recopy them to the lowest available location in core. This way the available memory was always at the top. Although this technique eliminated the need for storing a list of memory blocks, it was at the cost of expensive copies every time a program ended. Though impractical when compared to modern operating system models, Executive's was typical of the time; the model for most was a sort of "extended batch mode," running long-lived programs that paused when not being actively fed data.

The machine was also designed from the outset to allow it to scale across a wide variety of needs. The system included 64 hardware channels that could be connected to peripherals of any sort and could be supplied with a wide variety of core memory sizes. In other ways the machine was fairly similar to the ReserVec's Gemini machine, using a 24-bit word with a 25th-bit for parity checking and a simple machine language. One change was the lack of a memory drum, as the advances in core allowed them to replace the drum entirely.

== Sales ==
Development of the FP-6000 was completed in late 1962, and the first production machine was delivered to the Federal Reserve Bank in early 1963. The prototype machine was later greatly expanded into the largest FP-6000 installation and sold to Saskatchewan Power, the provincial electrical supply crown corporation for use in performing both engineering calculations and customer billing simultaneously. From there, additional sales proved very difficult. Over the next year they sold one to the Defence Research Establishment Atlantic, in Dartmouth, Nova Scotia and the other to the Toronto Stock Exchange (TSX). The later machine allowed the TSX to become the first computerized exchange a few years later. Sales attempts to the City of Toronto to drive the world's first computerized traffic control system failed, as did a sale to Ontario's Treasury department.

Sales by Ferranti UK were also non-existent. For years the Canadian division had to put up with not invented here problems and found their efforts continually blocked by the UK computer division's managers. It seemed that the FP-6000 was to suffer a similar fate, and the UK division had argued with the Canadian engineers about practically every part of the design. The real reason for the recalcitrance, in this case, would not become clear until later in the year.

Ferranti had been supporting their UK computer division for over a decade at this point, but had failed to make any significant sales. Management was tired of the drain on company resources and decided to sell off the division entirely. They initially entered discussions with International Computers and Tabulators in early 1963, but ICT looked at the continual losses and was less than interested. Ferranti then "sweetened" the deal by showing them the FP-6000, offering to include that in the deal if ICT bought the division.

ICT was in the midst of re-designing its own series of low-end machines and had been considering licensing an RCA IBM-compatible design. However, the FP-6000 offered them a more attractive system that could be scaled with the addition of smaller and larger machines to produce an entire line. ICT was finally interested, as one Ferranti board member put it, "without the FP-6000 we would not have gotten the deal we wanted from ICT. The FP-6000 was the golden brick in the sale of our operations." The deal was announced in June 1963, to the surprise of the Canadian division.

The FP-6000, with the addition of the ICT Standard Interface, became the ICT 1904, and a slightly modified version would be offered as the ICT 1905. The Canadian division offered to build both of these machines, which seemed obvious, as well as headquarters North American sales and marketing. However, ICT was interested only in the European market and declined on both offers.

The entire hardware team resigned and formed an electronics company known as ESE, later purchased by Motorola. They were soon followed by the software team, who formed I. P. Sharp Associates, a major Canadian programming firm of the 1970s and 80s. The team in charge of the system's storage devices left some time later in 1967 to form Teklogix.

SaskPower ran their FP-6000 for 20 years before retiring it in 1982. The machine was donated to the Western Development Museum in 1983, and is the last remaining example.
