= MOP =

MOP, mop or MoP may refer to:

== Organizations ==
- Ministry of Public Works (Chile), a Government ministry of Chile
- Messengers of Peace (Scouting) (MoP), a programme
- Museum of Printing, in Haverhill, Massachusetts, US
- Mathematical Olympiad Program, the United States' training camp for the International Mathematical Olympiad
- Movement for the Organization of the Country (French: Mouvement pour l'Organisation du Pays), former Haitian political party

== Science and technology ==
- M-opioid receptor or mu opioid peptide (MOP) receptor, a class of opioid receptors
- MOP flippase (Multidrug/Oligosaccharidyl-lipid/Polysaccharide Flippase), a superfamily of transport proteins
- Muriate of potash, a fertilizer
- Mother of pearl, a composite material

=== Computing ===
- Maintenance Operations Protocol, in computer networks
- Metaobject protocol, a technique that allows a computer programmer to extend or alter the semantics of a language
- Multiple Online Programming; see MINIMOP

== Sports ==
- Major opportunity point, tennis terminology used to describe the point 0-30
- Most Outstanding Player (disambiguation)
  - NCAA Division I basketball tournament Most Outstanding Player, in the NCAA basketball tournaments
  - NCAA Division I men's ice hockey tournament Most Outstanding Player, in NCAA ice hockey tournaments

== Other uses ==
- Mount Pleasant Municipal Airport (Michigan) (IATA: MOP), in Mount Pleasant, Michigan, US
- Macanese pataca (ISO 4217 code), the currency of Macau
- Mop, an implement for mopping floors
- GBU-57A/B MOP (Massive Ordnance Penetrator), a bomb used by the US Air Force
- Manual of Practice, published by the Construction Specifications Institute
- M.O.P. (Mash Out Posse), an American rap duo
- Mop, a type of paintbrush

== See also ==
- Mop & the Dropouts, a 1980s Australian band led by Mop Conlon
- MOPP (disambiguation)
- Mops (disambiguation)
- Moppy (disambiguation)
