= DATAR =

Computerized battlefield information system

Digital Automated Tracking and Resolving (DATAR)
- The "double plot" graphical user interface which displayed all the tracking information from the DATAR computer (note the trackball at the front of the control console).
- Developer: Royal Canadian Navy in partnership with Ferranti Canada
- Released: Prototype tested in 1953
- Introductory price: CAN$1.9 million (about CAN$ 23 million in 2025 dollars)
- Memory: Drum memory
- Display: Adapted radar unit
- Input: Trackball and trigger

DATAR, short for Digital Automated Tracking and Resolving, was a pioneering computerized battlefield information system. DATAR combined the data from all of the sensors in a naval task force into a single "overall view" that was then transmitted back to all of the ships and displayed on plan-position indicators similar to radar displays. Commanders could then see information from everywhere, not just their own ship's sensors.

Development of the DATAR system was spurred by the Royal Navy's work on the Comprehensive Display System (CDS), which Canadian engineers were familiar with. The project was started by the Royal Canadian Navy in partnership with Ferranti Canada (later known as Ferranti-Packard) in 1949. They were aware of CDS and a US Navy project along similar lines but believed their solution was so superior that they would eventually be able to develop the system on behalf of all three forces. They also believed sales were possible to the Royal Canadian Air Force and US Air Force for continental air control.

A demonstration carried out in the fall of 1953 was by most measures an unqualified success, to the point where some observers thought it was being faked. By this time the US Air Force was well into development of their SAGE system and the RCAF decided that commonality with that force was more important than commonality with their own Navy. The Royal Navy computerized their CDS in the new Action Data Automation system, and the US Navy decided on a somewhat simpler system, the Naval Tactical Data System. No orders for DATAR were forthcoming.

When one of the two computers was destroyed by fire, the company was unable to raise funds for a replacement, and the project ended. The circuitry design used in the system would be applied to several other Ferranti machines over the next few years.

== History ==
=== Canadian Navy during the War ===
At the Atlantic Convoy Conference of 1943, Canada was given shared control of all convoys running between the British Isles and North America. At the time, it was a role of unprecedented importance because it gave Canada a key command role over the United States. After the war, Canada sought to protect its role as the Western Alliance's anti-submarine and escort navy. In order to do so, they would need to invest in an ambitious naval research agenda.

=== Early research ===
In 1948, the Canadian Defence Research Board sent a letter to various Canadian electronics firms informing them of their intention to start a number of projects that would partner the military, academia and private companies. A copy of the letter was sent to Ferranti Canada, then a small distributor of Ferranti's United Kingdom electrical equipment. The letter was forwarded to the then-CEO of Ferranti in the UK, Vincent Ziani de Ferranti, who became excited at the prospect of enlarging their Canadian operations largely funded by the government. At a meeting in October 1948 de Ferranti was disappointed to learn that while the DRB was equally excited, the amount of money they had to offer was basically zero.

== Belyea's concept ==
Word of the meeting reached Jim Belyea, a researcher at the Navy's electrical laboratories outside Ottawa. Belyea had been developing the idea of an automated battlefield control system for some time, after having studied the problem of dealing with a coordinated attack by submarines on convoys. During World War II the slow speeds and short submerged range of the typical U-boat allowed the defenders to deal with them one-by-one, but as the capabilities of the newer Soviet designs improved it appeared that a coordinated all-underwater attack was a real possibility, one for which he felt an effective defence would require much faster reaction times.

Belyea's idea was to share radar and sonar data between ships, processing the data in order to present a unified view of the battlefield relative to any particular ship's current heading and location. Belyea had experience with naval training simulators, and thus knew that conventional electrical analogue computation and display would not be sufficient for DATAR.

Belyea's basic idea of sharing precise real time radar and sonar data between all ships in a convoy, compensating for ship movement and distinguishing between friendly and enemy ships was years ahead of its time. Indeed, it was a quantum jump into the future and although I am by no means up to date at the time of writing (September, 2002) I am virtually certain that all modern naval task forces basically incorporate the Belyea concepts.

However he had no good idea how to accomplish this, so he approached Ferranti, who had recently met with the DRB. Instead of the cash-strapped DRB, Belyea offered funding directly from the Navy itself. As Belyea was a lieutenant, he only had authority to approve contracts up to CAN$5,000. As a cunning solution, Belyea put out several contracts under different names all to Ferranti. This solution pleased everyone and the DATAR project was born in 1949, Ferranti setting up a new shop under the direction of Kenyon Taylor in Malton near the Avro Canada plants.

== The DATAR prototype ==
By 1950 the small team at Ferranti Canada had built a working pulse-code modulation (PCM) radio system that was able to transmit digitized radar data over long distances. The opening of the Korean War dramatically shifted the government's spending priorities, and 100 new ships were ordered in 1951. Along with this came renewed interest in DATAR, and over the next two years they spent $1.9 million ($23 million in 2025) developing a prototype. The prototype machine used 3,800 vacuum tubes (Note: Sources have inflated the number of tubes reportedly used by DATAR to ridiculous numbers, from 10,000 to 20,000 and finally to 30,000.) and stored data for up to 500 objects on a magnetic drum. The system could supply data for 64 targets with a resolution of 40 by 40 yards over an 80 by 80 nautical mile grid.

In a production setting, only one ship in a task force would carry the DATAR computer. The rest of the ships had computer terminals that allowed the operators to use a trackball based on a Canadian five-pin bowling ball and trigger to send position info over the PCM links to the DATAR. (Note: A number of historical reports covering DATAR claim the trackball was invented for DATAR, but the trackball was already in use in the late 1940s as part of a UK project that was essentially an analog computer version of the same concept. This CDS system was known to Canadian engineers at the time.) DATAR then processed the locations, translated everything into the various ship's local view, and sent the data back to them over the same PCM links. Here it was displayed on another console originally adapted from a radar unit. In contrast with the United States Air Force's Semi Automatic Ground Environment (SAGE) system, DATAR did not develop tracks automatically, relying on the operators to continue feeding new data into the system by hand.

== "Battleships" on Lake Ontario ==
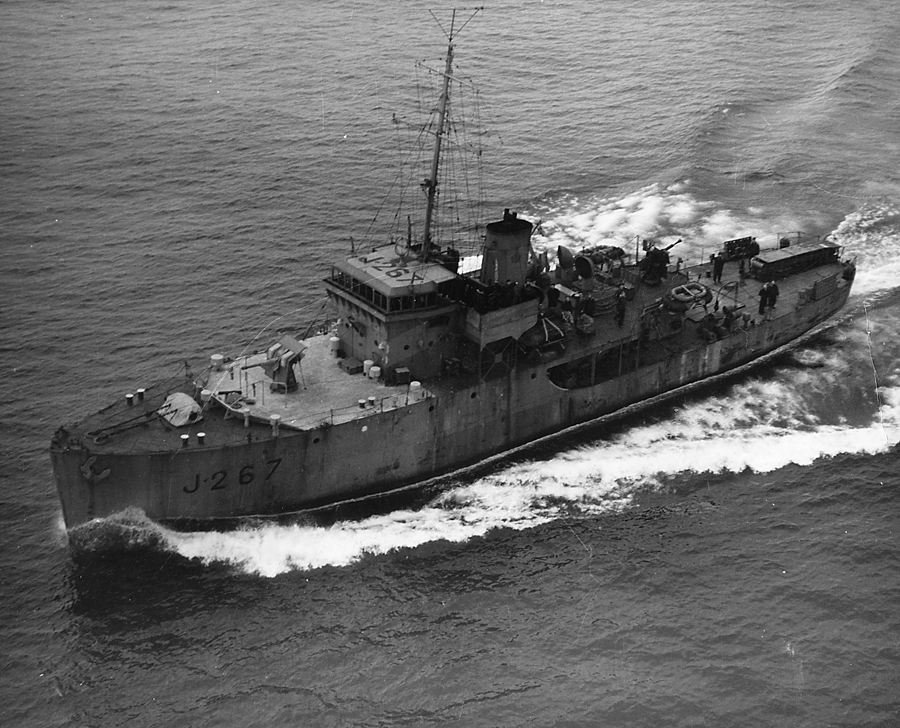
HMCS Digby was used to test DATAR on Lake Ontario.

The system was first tested in late 1953 on Lake Ontario. A simulated convoy was set up, consisting of a shore station on the Scarborough Bluffs and two Bangor-class minesweepers, HMCS Digby and HMCS Granby. DATAR performed well, everyone being sent proper displays of the radar and simulated sonar "blips". The test was a complete success, and the Navy was apparently extremely pleased. The only serious concern was the failure rate of the tubes, which meant that the machine was non-operational for a considerable amount of time. Ferranti was extremely interested in adapting the DATAR system to a transistor-based design, which they believed would solve this issue.

However, equipping the entire Royal Canadian Navy's fleet would be extremely expensive. In order to lower the overall cost, the Navy wanted to spread the development costs across a larger production line, and invited representatives of the Royal Navy and US Navy to view the system. They proved to be equally impressed; one US officer was too impressed and looked under the display console, believing the display was being faked. But no matter how impressed they were, it appears they felt they could do better on their own, and declined to get involved. The Royal Navy would start work on their Comprehensive Display System that year under the direction of Elliot Brothers, and the US Navy's Naval Tactical Data System in 1956.

The DATAR project thus ended on a somewhat sour note. The system had gone from concept to working prototype in less than four years, and was by any measure a complete success. Yet the cost of deployment was simply too much for the Royal Canadian Navy to bear alone, and they decided to do without.

== DATAR's legacy ==
The DATAR work did not go completely to waste. Ferranti Canada used the basic DATAR design on a number of projects, transistorizing it in the process. The system eventually led to both ReserVec and the Ferranti-Packard 6000 mainframe.
