= Psion Teklogix =

Software company in Canada

- Type: Subsidiary of Zebra Technologies
- Industry: Technology, Computers, RFID, WiFi, Mobile Devices, Wireless LAN, Bluetooth, Data Capture
- Predecessor: Psion, Teklogix
- Founded: 2000
- Headquarters: Mississauga, Ontario, Canada
- Key people: David Potter, (Chairman); John Conoley (CEO)
- Products: NEO, Ikôn, Workabout PRO, 7530, 7535
- Revenue: £199.7 million (2007)
- Operating income: £9.5 million (2007)
- Net income: £7.0 million (2007)
- Number of employees: 1,229 (2007)
- Parent: Zebra Technologies

Psion Teklogix Inc. was the operational business of Psion.

Psion Teklogix is a global provider of solutions for mobile computing and Wireless data collection. Psion Teklogix' products and services include rugged mobile hardware, secure wireless networks, software, professional services and support programs.

Psion Teklogix was formed in September 2000 as a result of the merger between U.K.-based Psion Enterprise division of Psion PLC, and Canadian-based Teklogix Inc.
Psion Teklogix is headquartered in Mississauga, Ontario, Canada with additional corporate offices located in Europe, the United States, Asia, Latin America and the Middle East.
Psion Teklogix is an ISO 9001:2000 registered company, and holds a certificate of registration from the British Standards Institution.

In 2012 Motorola Solutions purchased Psion Teklogix for $200 million.

In October 2014, the Motorola Solutions' enterprise business (including assets acquired in the Psion Teklogix purchase) was sold to Zebra Technologies for $3.45B.

== History ==
Teklogix was created in 1967 by Rod Coutts, a 1964 bachelor of applied science in electrical engineering, together with a small group of young Canadian engineers. The company grew to specialize in empowering mobile workers with wireless data transmission and real-time data management within the logistics industry.

The Psion Group, founded in 1980 by David Potter, is widely credited with having created the world's first volume produced PDA with the launch of the Psion Organiser in 1984. Generally recognized as the world's first practical pocket computer, the Organiser helped evolve Psion into a major technology player.

In 2000 Psion acquired Teklogix in Canada for £240 million, and merged its business-to-business division, Psion Enterprise, with the newly acquired company. Teklogix was re-branded Psion Teklogix. This division now forms the core of Psion Plc's business.

In 2002 Psion Teklogix created a new division called Psion Software. This business developed push email solutions for Symbian smartphones, Microsoft Exchange and Lotus Notes. This business was sold to Visto (USA) in 2003.

In 2004, Psion Teklogix announced its intention to dispose of the company's remaining Symbian shareholding to Nokia, as they no longer regarded it as a core part of their strategy.

In 2005, Psion Teklogix acquired Ottawa-based image capture firm Symagery Microsystems.

In 2011, the company dropped "Teklogix" from its name.

In 2012, Psion Teklogix was acquired by Motorola for US$200 million.

== Psion Teklogix and Linux ==
Psion PLC had a lengthy, but distant, interest in Linux as an operating system on its electronic devices. In 1998, it supported the Linux7K project that had been initiated by Ed Bailey at Red Hat, which was to port Linux to its Series 5 personal computer. The project was named after the Cirrus Logic PS-7110 chip of the Series 5. Although this project was one of the earliest attempts to port Linux to a handheld computer, it did not come to fruition for Psion. The project soon transitioned to an informal open source project at Calcaria.net, that kept the name Linux7K. After the project transitioned again to sourceforge.net, the project's name was changed to a more general name "PsiLinux", and more recently to "OpenPsion". The project has developed Linux kernels and filesystems for the Revo, Series 5 and 5MX, and Series 7 and netBook.

In 2003–4, Psion Teklogix and its founder David Potter expressed interest in Linux as the operating system for its devices as it divested from Symbian. However, the only result of that interest was Linux as the operating system on a limited number of custom NetBook Pros designed for a hospital setting.

== Psion Teklogix and the term Netbook ==
Psion registered the trademark NETBOOK in various territories, including European Union and U.S. Trademark 75,215,401, which was applied for on 18 December 1996 and registered by USPTO on 21 November 2000. They used this trademark for the Psion netBook product (discontinued in November 2003) and more recently the NETBOOK PRO, from October 2003 onwards.

Intel began the use of the term netbook in March 2008 as a generic term to describe "small laptops that are designed for wireless communication and access to the Internet", believing they were "not offering a branded line of computers here" and "see no naming conflict".

In response to the growing use of this term, on 23 December 2008 Psion Teklogix sent cease and desist letters to various parties including enthusiast website(s) demanding they no longer use the term "netbook".

In early 2009 Intel sued Psion Teklogix (US & Canada) and Psion (UK) in the Federal Court, seeking a cancellation of the trademark and an order enjoining Psion from asserting any trademark rights in the term "netbook", a declarative judgement regarding their use of the term, attorneys' fees, costs and disbursements and "such other and further relief as the Court deems just and proper". The suit was settled out of court, and on June 2, 2009 Psion announced that the company was withdrawing all of its trademark registrations for the term "Netbook" and that Psion agreed to "waive all its rights against third parties in respect of past, current or future use" of the term.

Similar marks have been recently rejected by the USPTO citing a "likelihood of confusion" under section 2(d), including 'G NETBOOK' (U.S. Trademark 77,527,311 rejected 31 October 2008), MSI's 'WIND NETBOOK' (U.S. Trademark 77,580,272) and Coby Electronics' 'COBY NETBOOK' (U.S. Trademark 77,590,174 rejected 13 January 2009).
