= David E. Potter =

South African businessman (1943–2026)

David Edwin Potter CBE FREng (4 July 1943 – 28 June 2026) was a South African businessman who was the founder and chairman of the microcomputer systems company Psion PLC., and Psion Teklogix after Psion's acquisition of Teklogix in 2000.

== Early life and education ==
Potter was born in East London, South Africa, in 1943 and brought up in Cape Town. In 1963 he took up a Beit scholarship to read natural sciences at Trinity College, Cambridge. In 1966 he was awarded a Commonwealth Scholarship to study for a doctorate in mathematical physics at Imperial College London, where he was subsequently appointed to the staff. As an academic during the 1970s, he taught at the University of London and at the University of California, consulted and wrote a number of academic papers and a book on the use of computers in physics.

== Career at Psion ==
Potter founded Psion in 1980. In its early years, Psion became a leader in software for home microcomputers. In 1984, Psion invented 'The Organizer', the world's first volume hand-held computer for personal use and information.

In 1988, Potter led Psion's flotation on the London Stock Exchange, which saw Psion's scale and value multiply many times. The company expanded further into data communications and mobile corporate services. In 1998, using Psion's experience in small mobile operating systems, Potter led the creation of Symbian Limited in partnership with Nokia, Ericsson, Motorola and Matsushita to create the operating system standard for mobile wireless devices – now known as Symbian.

In 1999, Potter stood down as chief executive of the company and assumed the role of chairman. He retired as chairman in September 2009.

== Other activities ==
Potter was a member of the London Regional Council of the CBI, a board member of the London First Centre and co-chairman of the London Manufacturing Group. From 1999 to 2003 he was a member of The Council for Science and Technology reporting to the Cabinet.

He served on the 1997 National Committee of Inquiry into Higher Education (The Dearing Committee), and continued his involvement in higher education policy as a board member of the Higher Education Funding Council for England. He also had extensive involvement with educational establishments as a Visiting Fellow of Nuffield College, Oxford, Honorary Fellow of Imperial College, London, and Honorary Fellow and Governor of the London Business School.

In 1993, Potter received the Mountbatten Medal from the Institution of Electrical Engineers and received Honorary Doctorate Degrees from a number of universities including Warwick, Sheffield, Edinburgh and York.

Potter wrote and lectured widely on technology and the new economy, including the Stockton Lecture at London Business School in 1998, one of the Millennium Lectures at 10 Downing Street in 1999, and the Tacitus Lecture, 2000 at the Guildhall.

In 2001, Potter was one of the Labour Party's top 50 donors, giving £90,000 to its head office.

In 2012, he gave an interview about his life and reflections on the financial crash to Anthony Barnett and William Davies called Let's welcome the enmity of bankers

In September 2017, Potter was appointed Honorary Chairman of Planet Computers, a crowd-funded start-up producing the Gemini (PDA), a spiritual successor to the Psion Series 5.

== Personal life and death ==
Potter's interests included his family, education, farming, golf, music, bridge, reading and ideas, science and economics, and tennis. With their involvement in education and the developing world, his family created the David and Elaine Potter Foundation to support projects in education, research and third world development.

Potter died on 28 June 2026, at the age of 82.

== Honours ==
In the 1997 New Year Honours list, Potter was appointed a CBE for services to the manufacturing industry and in 2001 he was elected a Fellow of the Royal Academy of Engineers. In 1999, he was chosen as Entrepreneur of the Year in the annual UK PLC Awards. In June 2003, Potter was appointed a non-Executive Director to the Bank of England, stepping down in 2009.

== Obituaries and appreciations ==
'Remembering David Potter: Industrialist, physicist, philanthropist' by Anthony Barnett

'The maverick academic who almost made a British Sony' by Andrew Orlowski
