= Flip-disc display =

Electromechanical equivalent

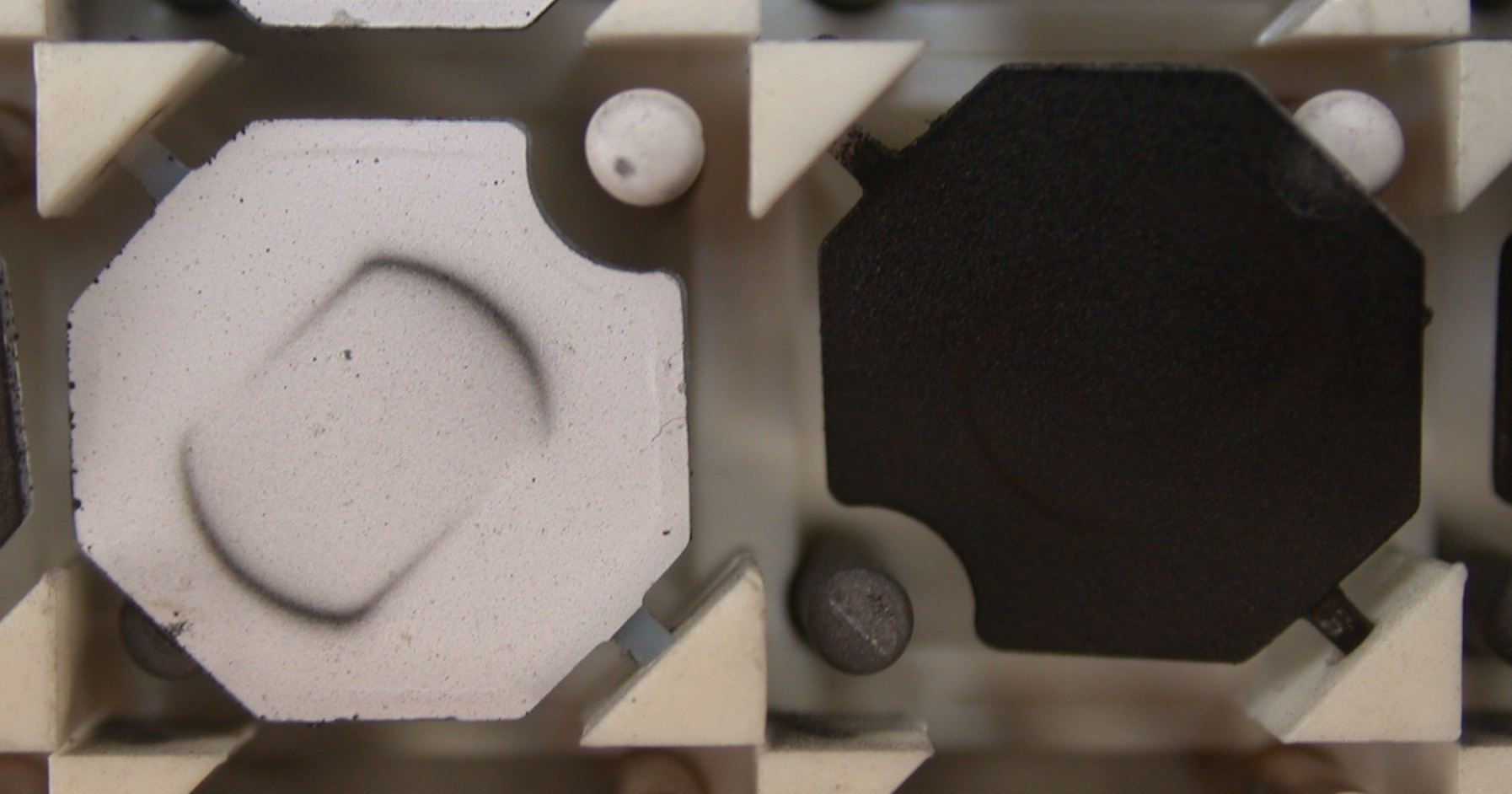
Flip-disc display elements (close up). The disc rotates on the shaft that is carried in the two triangular posts. The magnet that powers the rotation can be seen embedded in the disc. Under the disc is the driving solenoid; when powered, a field is induced into the two posts, flipping the discs. Rotation stops when the disc hits the post.

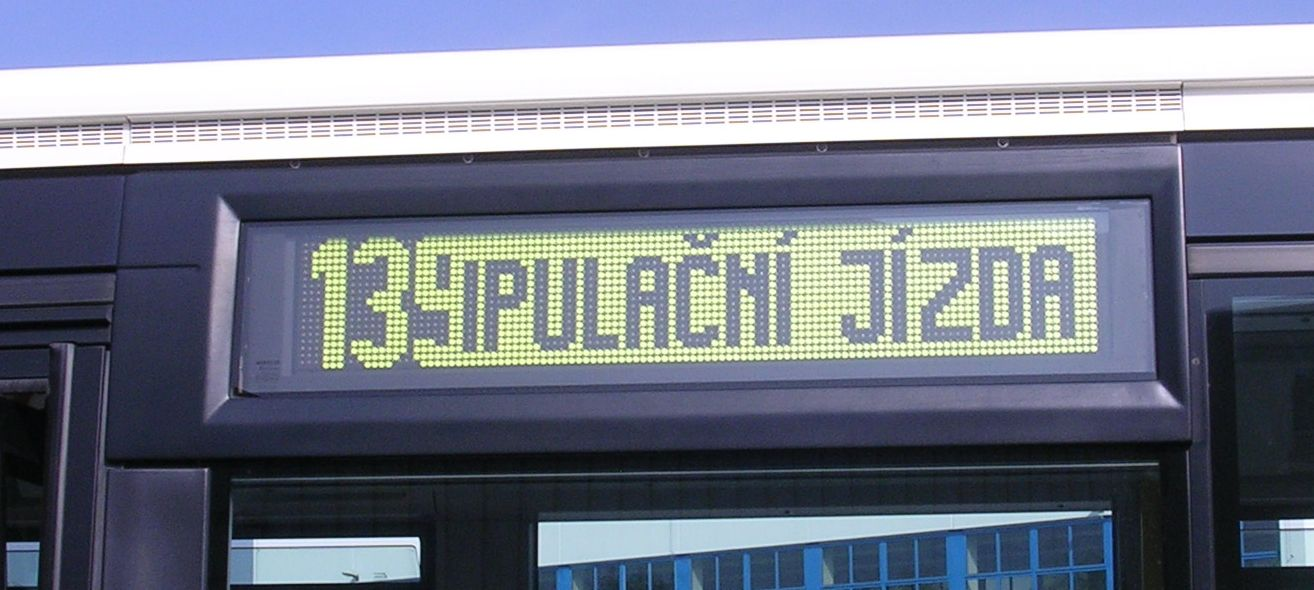
DOT-LED display of a bus Irisbus Citybus 18M (made 2004), photographed while a change is scrolling across the board

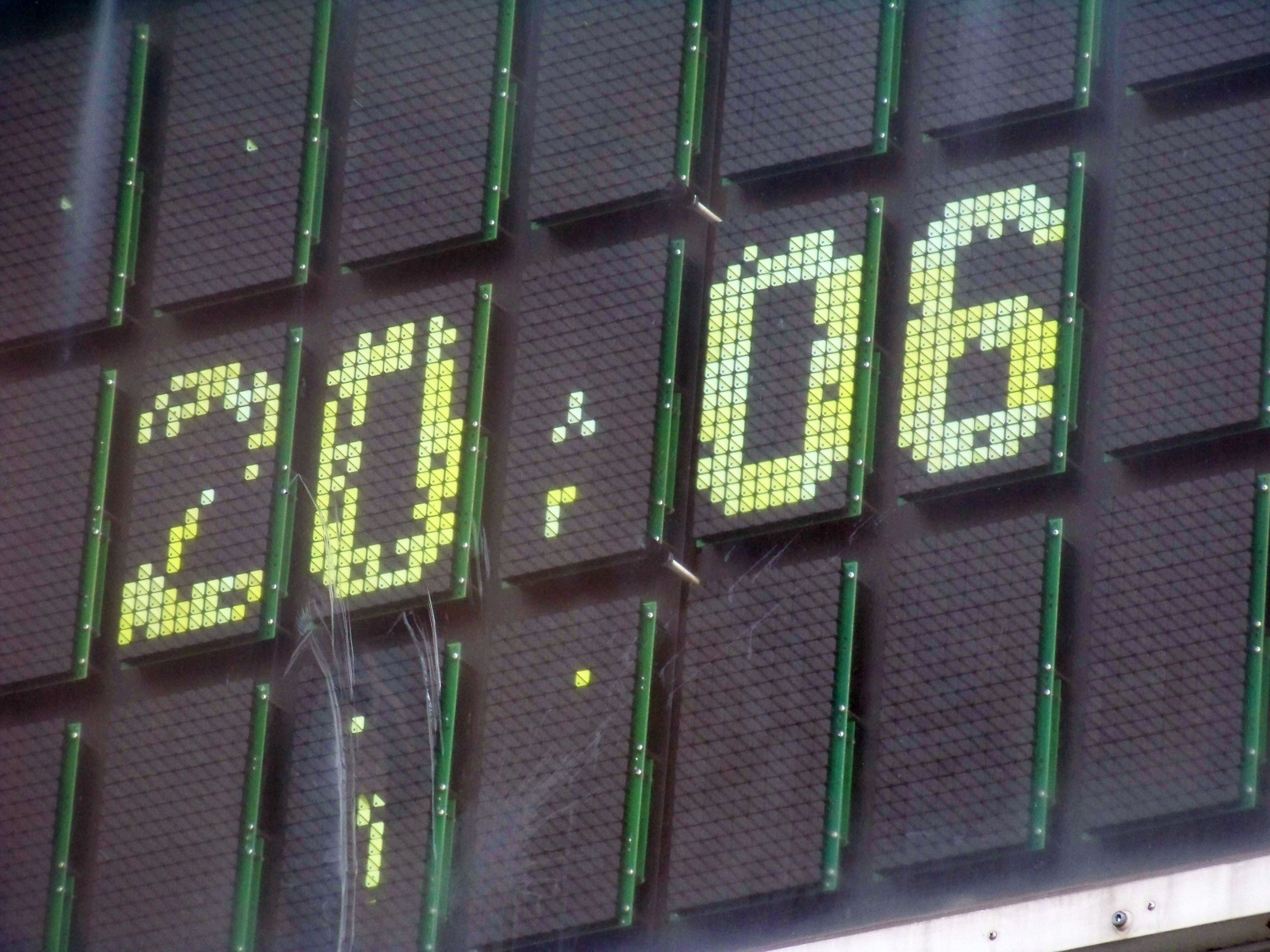
Faulty dots are a typical malfunction of flip-disc displays.

The flip-disc display (or flip-dot display) is an electromechanical dot matrix display technology used for large outdoor signs, normally those that will be exposed to direct sunlight. Flip-disc technology has been used for external destination signs on buses and trains across North America, Europe, Australia and Asia, as well as for variable-message signs on highways. It has also been used extensively on public information displays. A few game shows have also used flip-disc displays, including Canadian shows like Just Like Mom, The Joke's on Us and Uh Oh!, but most notably the American game show Family Feud from 1976 to 1995, and its British version Family Fortunes from 1980 to 2002. The Polish version of Family Feud, Familiada, still uses this board, which was bought from the Swedish version of the show.

== Design ==
The flip-disc display consists of a grid of small metal discs that are black on one side and a contrasting bright color on the other, set into a dark background. When a brief electrical pulse is applied to the coil, the disc flips to show the opposite side. Once flipped, the discs will remain in position without power.

The disc is attached to an axle which also carries a small permanent magnet. A solenoid is positioned close to the permanent magnet and generates a magnetic field when an electrical current passes through its coil. By applying a current pulse of the appropriate polarity to the solenoid, a magnetic force is generated that produces torque on the permanent magnet, rotating the axle and disc. Another design incorporates a permanent magnet directly into the disc assembly, with solenoids positioned nearby to generate the magnetic field required to flip the disc.

A computerized driver system reads data, typically characters, and flips the appropriate discs to produce the desired display. Some displays use the magnetic field at the opposite end of the solenoid to actuate a reed switch, which controls an LED array behind the disc. This provides nighttime visibility but still requires suitable LED control and power circuitry.

Various driving schemes are in use. Their basic purpose is to reduce the amount of wiring and electronics needed to drive the solenoids. All common methods connect the solenoids in some sort of matrix. One driving method is similar to that of core memory: the solenoids are connected in a simple matrix. Those solenoids at the crossing point of two powered wires are driven with enough current to flip their discs; those powered on only the vertical or horizontal line see only half of the required force (as flux is proportional to current, which in turn is proportional to the voltage). Those on unpowered lines also do not flip.

Typically, the driving scheme works its way from top to bottom, powering each horizontal line "on" and then powering the needed vertical lines to set up that row. The whole process takes a few seconds, during which time the sound of the discs being flipped over is quite distinctive.

Other driving schemes use diodes to isolate non-driven solenoids, which allows only the discs whose state needs changing to be flipped. This uses less power and may be more robust.

== History ==
The flip-disc display was developed by Kenyon Taylor at Ferranti-Packard at the request of Trans-Canada Air Lines (today's Air Canada). By the time the system had been patented in 1961, TCA had already lost interest and Ferranti's management didn't consider the project very interesting.

The first big opportunity for this system came in 1961 when the Montreal Stock Exchange decided to modernize its method of displaying trading information. Ferranti-Packard and Westinghouse both bid on the project, Westinghouse using an electro-luminescent technology. Ferranti won the contract after demonstrating the system with a mock-up they built in a disused warehouse across the street from the exchange's new offices, using hand-painted dots moved by hand to show how the system would work. The dots were slowly replaced with operating modules as they became available. The $700,000 system (equivalent to $7,540,000 in 2025) was beset by delays and technical problems, but once it became fully operational it was considered very reliable.

The systems were relatively expensive because of their manual construction, typically completed by women who "sewed" the displays in a fashion very similar to the construction of magnetic-core memory. Worse, Ferranti signed maintenance contracts that were, by 1971, losing $12,000 a month. A re-organization of the engineering and maintenance department addressed the problems, and prices started to fall. By 1977 the system had won sales with half the world's major stock exchanges.

As prices fell, they were soon found in wider roles, notably that of highway signs and information systems for public transport. In Europe and in the United States, vane displays based on the same technology became popular for displaying prices at gasoline stations. In 1974 Ferranti started a project to build smaller versions for the front of buses and trains, and by 1977 revenue from these had already surpassed that from other lines of business. The displays often required minor maintenance to free up "stuck" discs.

== Alternative technologies ==
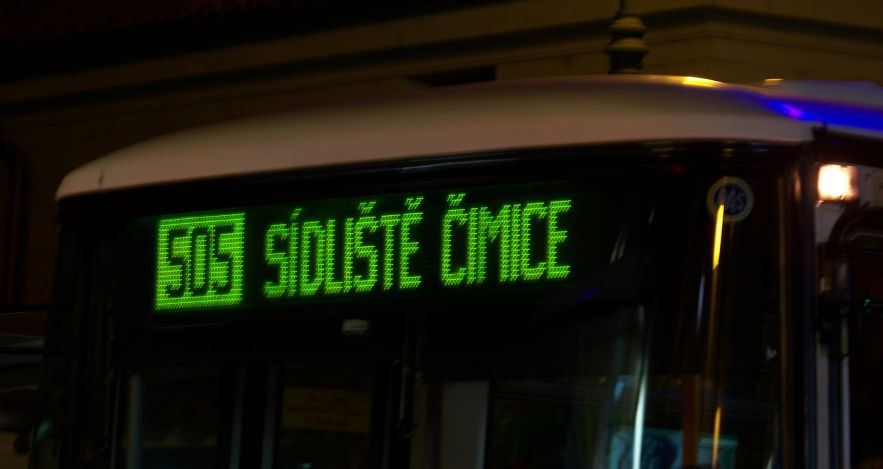
DOT-LED display at night

Flip-disc systems are still widespread but are not often found in new installations. Their place has been filled by LED-based products, which use a small amount of power constantly rather than each time the message changes, but are easily visible in both light and darkness, and, having no moving parts, require little maintenance.

Some producers offer combined displays that use flip-dot and LED technologies together (every dot-disc has its own LED) and thereby they combine their advantages. For example, the Czech company BUSE from Blansko supplies self-patented DOT-LED displays (only DOT and only LED as well) in Central and Eastern Europe. This combined technology was used for outside displays of most of new buses and trams.

== Application ==
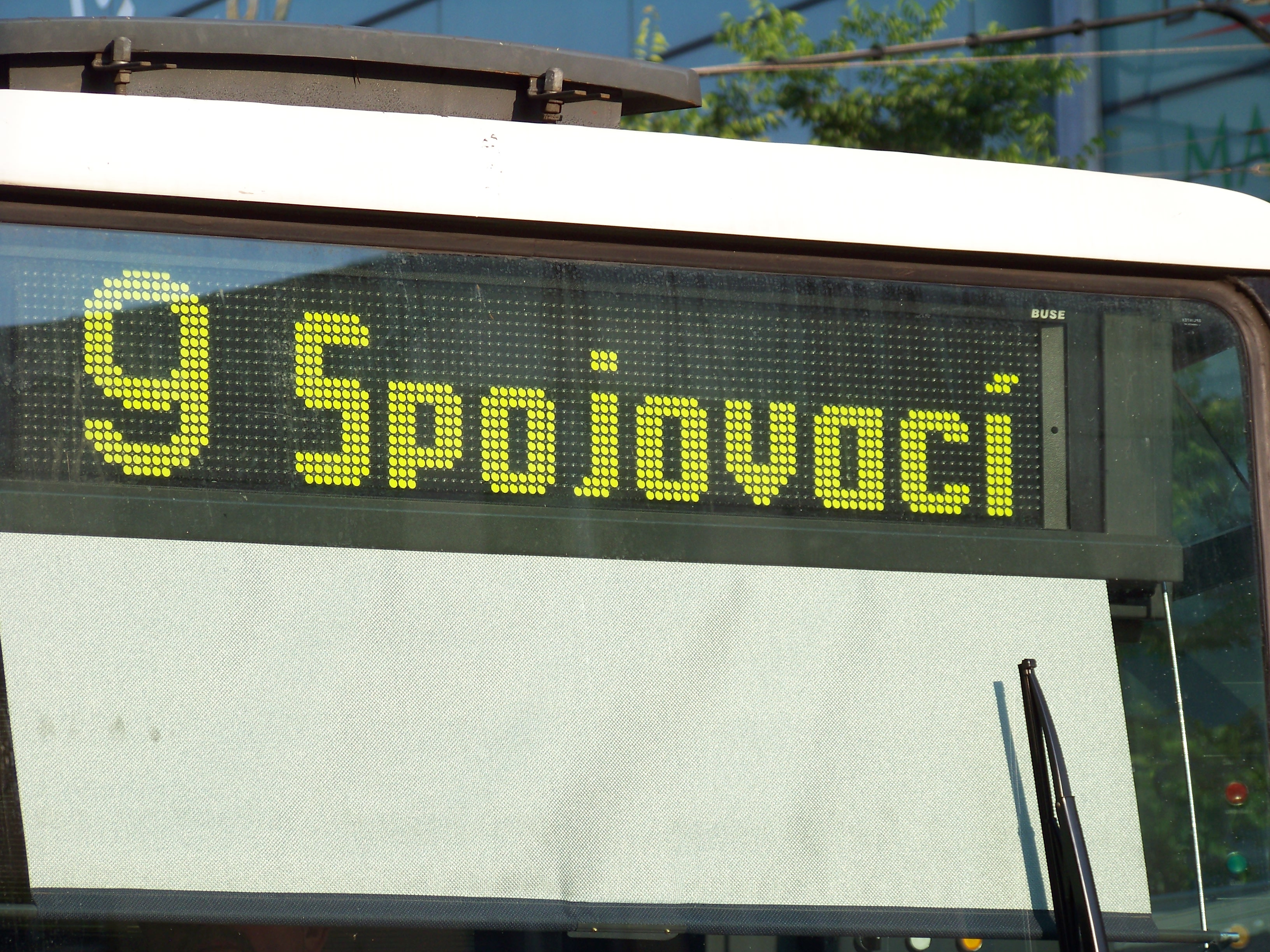
Destination and line number signs on public transport vehicles (tram in Prague, Czech Republic)

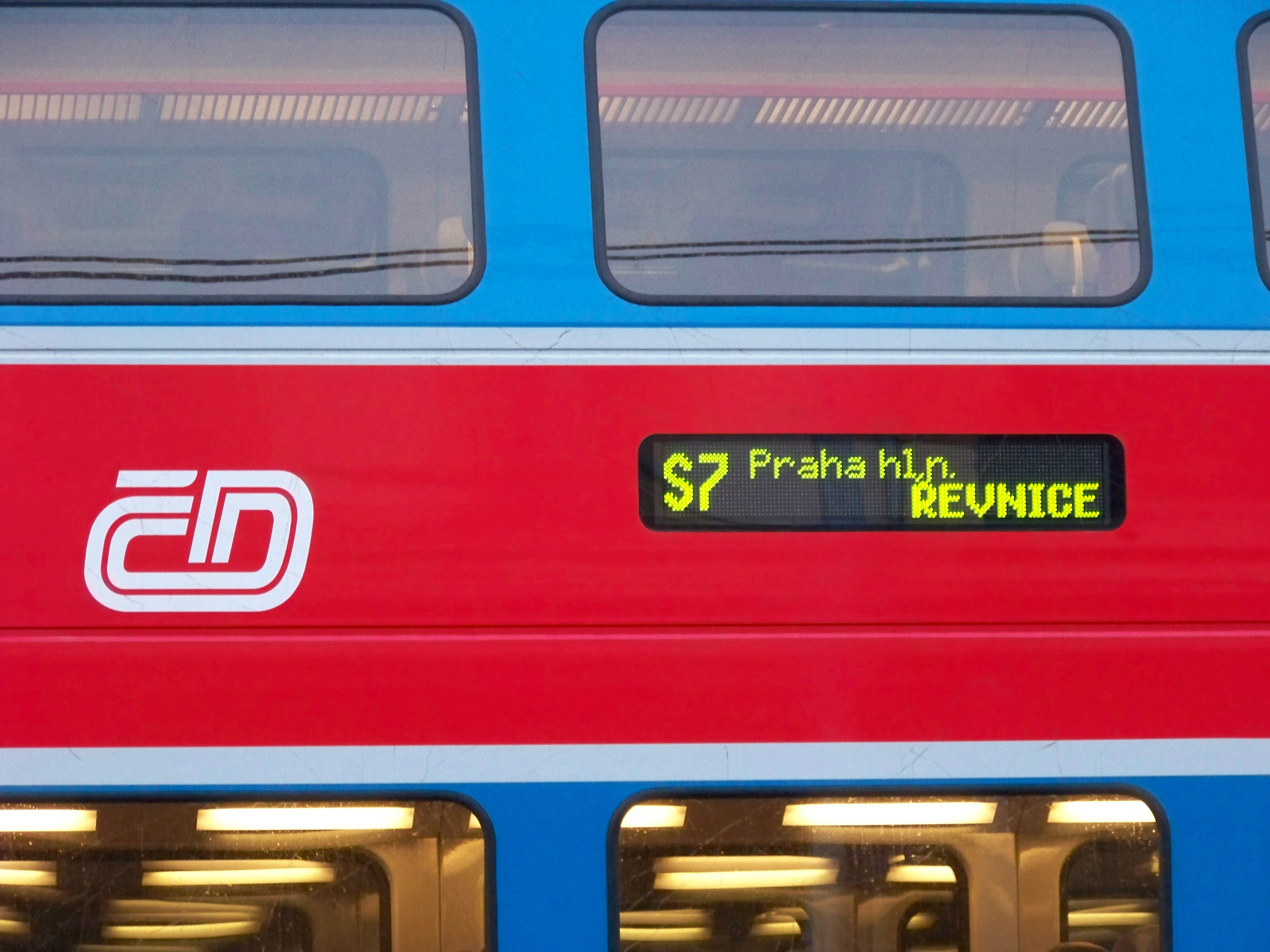
Destination and line number signs on public transport vehicles (a suburban train in Prague, Czech Republic)

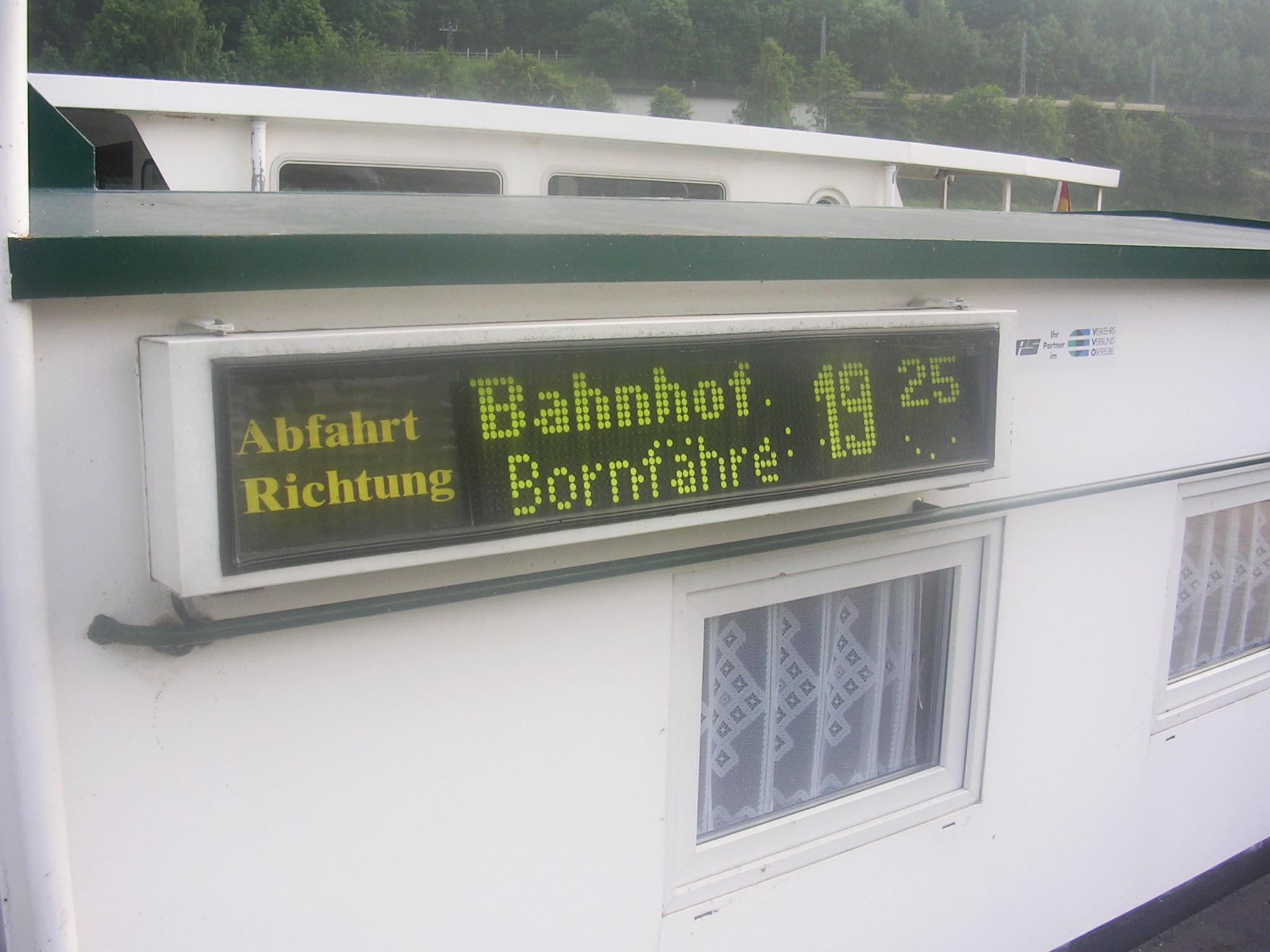
Departure boards at public transport stations and terminals (Elbe ferry Bad Schandau, Germany)

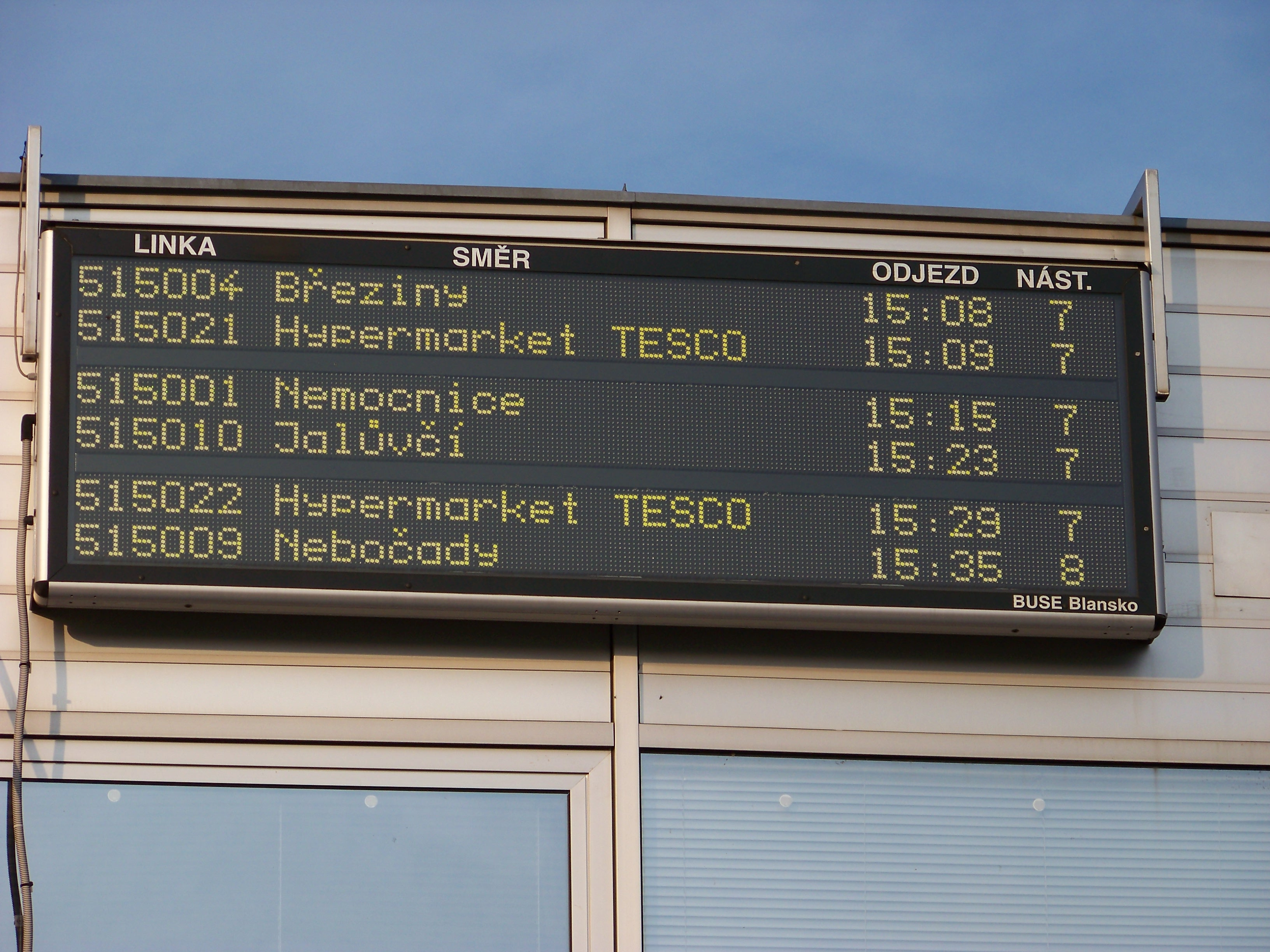
Departure boards at public transport stations and terminals (bus station in Děčín, Czech Republic)

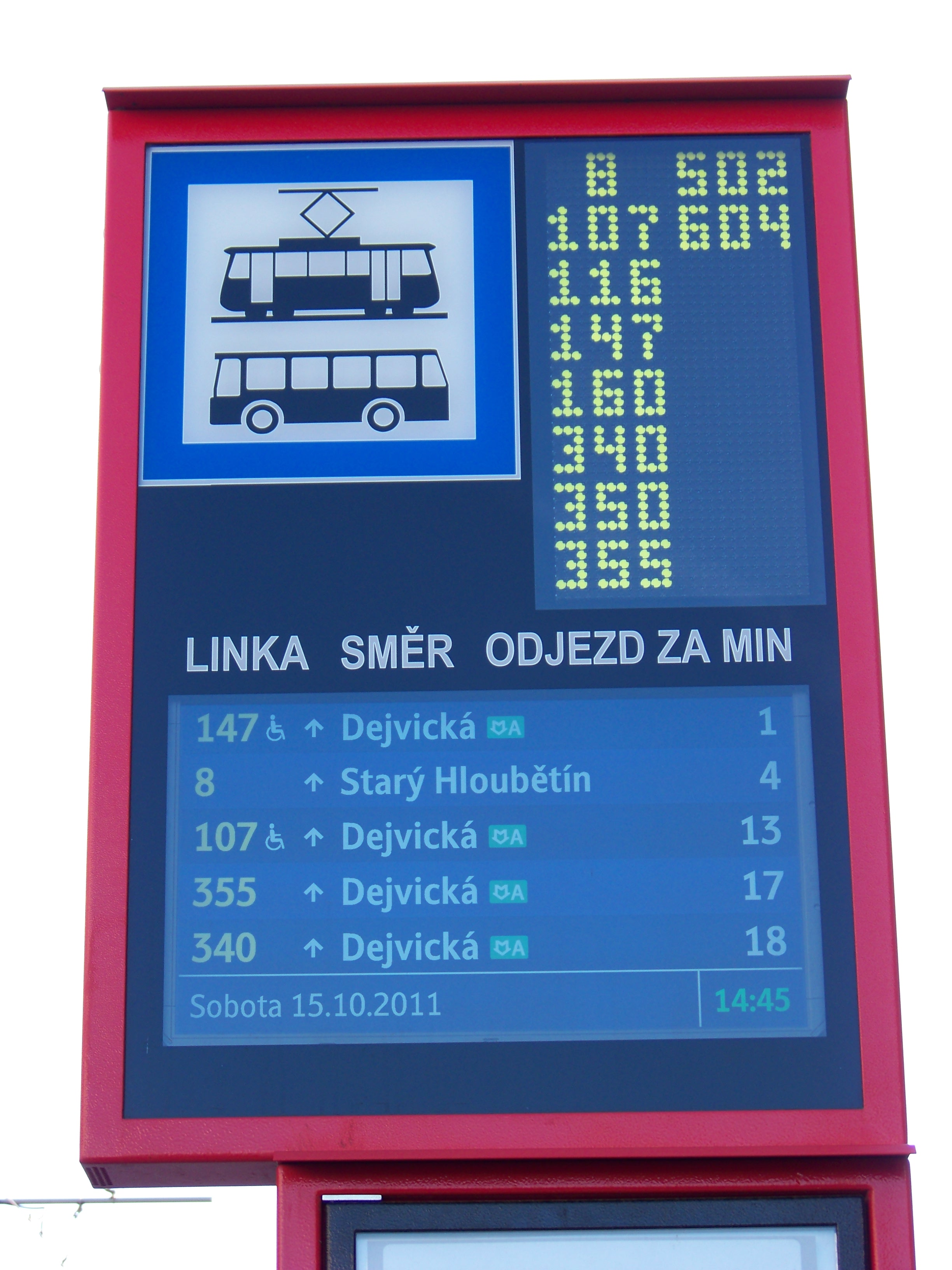
Line signs at public transport stops (Prague, Czech Republic)

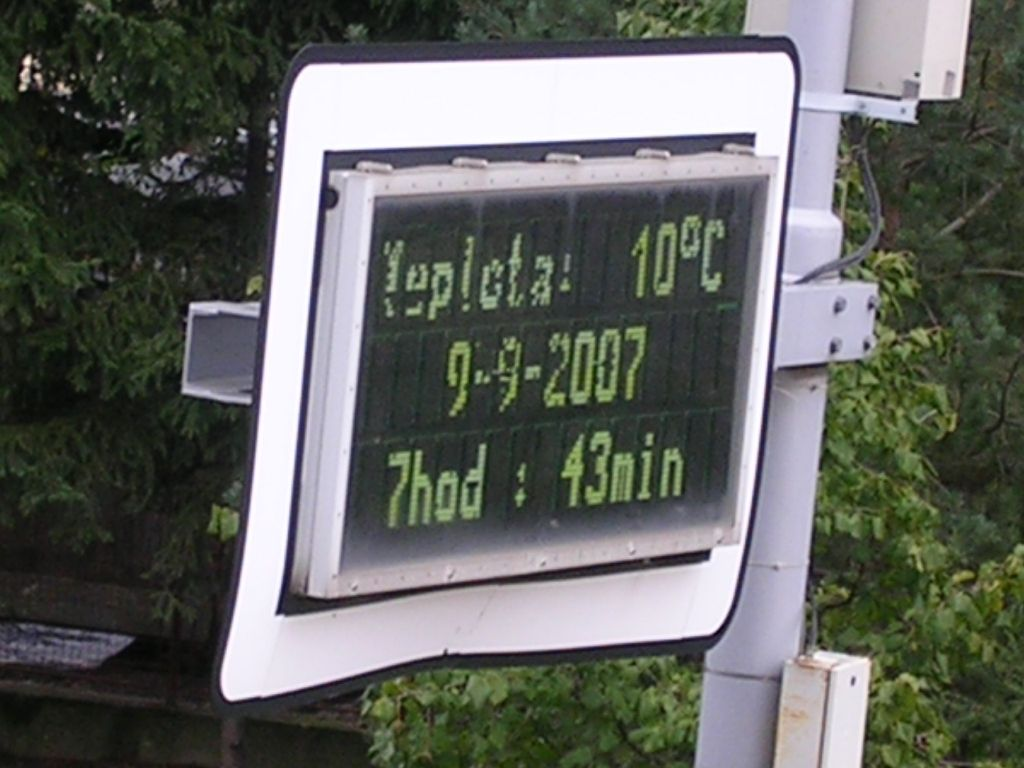
Road transport information (Prague, Czech Republic)

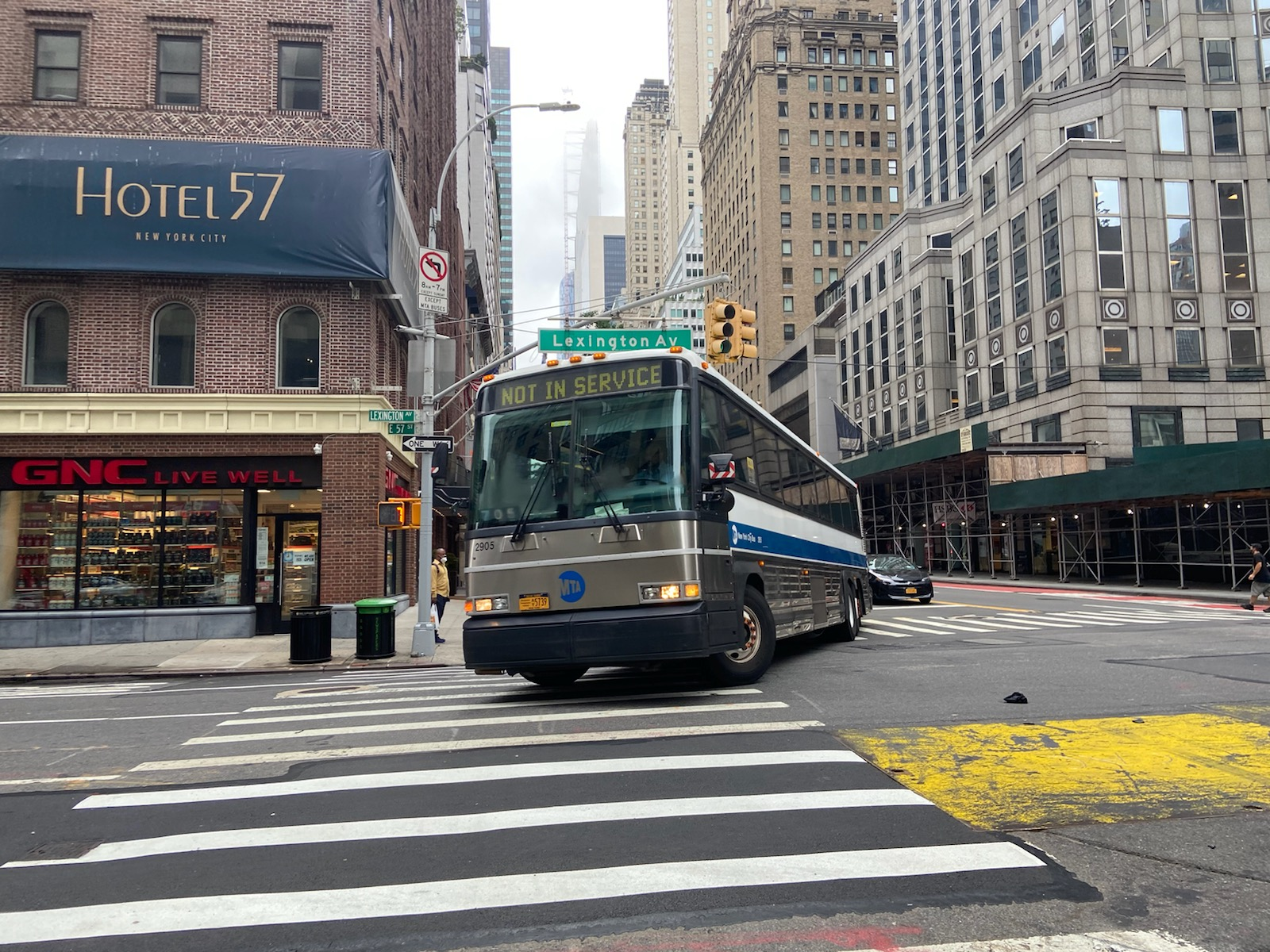
Destination sign on a MCI D4500 operating for the Metropolitan Transportation Authority (New York City, United States)

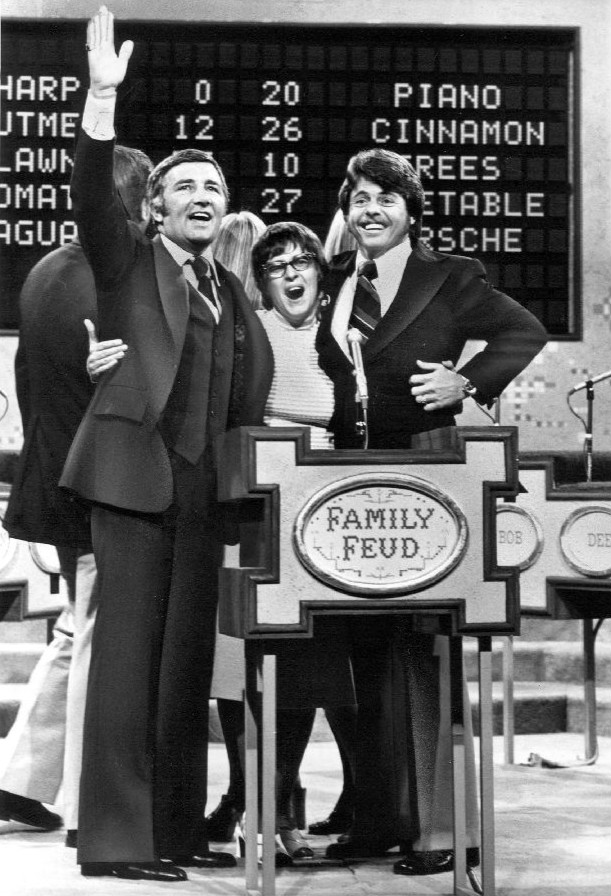
Ferranti-Packard display board used on the original version of Family Feud

== See also ==
- Digital micromirror device
- History of display technology
- Vane display, a display using a similar mechanism but configured as a 7-segment display
