= MOPP =

MOPP or Mopp may refer to:

== Science and technology ==
- MOPP (chemotherapy), a combination chemotherapy regimen used to treat Hodgkin's disease
- MOPP (electrical safety), in the standard for medical electrical equipment
- MOPP (protective gear), protective gear used by US military personnel in a toxic environment

== Other uses ==
- Moral Philosophy and Politics, an academic philosophical journal abbreviated as "MOPP"
- Max Oppenheimer (artist) (1885–1954), Austrian painter known as "Mopp"

== See also ==
- MOP (disambiguation)
- Mrs Mopp, a 1983 video game
- Mrs Mopp, a fictional character in the BBC radio show It's That Man Again
