= Moppy =

Moppy may refer to:

- Moppy River, a river in New South Wales, Australia
- Old Moppy, an Aboriginal Australian leader
- Marty "Moppy", a character in the TV series Corduroy
- Moppy, an inanimate supporting character/prop of professional wrestler Perry Saturn

== See also ==
- Mop
- MOP (disambiguation)
- Mops (disambiguation)
