= Ferranti Sirius =

1961 small business computer

Ferranti's Sirius was a minicomputer released in 1961 (operating in 1959 on a time rental basis). Designed to be used in smaller offices without a dedicated programming staff, the Sirius used decimal arithmetic instead of binary, supported Autocode to ease programming, was designed to fit behind a standard office desk, and ran on UK standard mains electricity (then 240 V) with no need for cooling. It was also fairly slow, with instruction speeds around 4,000 operations per second, and had limited main memory based on delay lines, but as Ferranti pointed out, its price/performance ratio was difficult to beat.

== History ==
=== Magnetic amplifiers ===
During the 1950s there was widespread interest in the use of magnetic amplifiers as a solid state switching device. The amplifiers used the saturation points and hysteresis curves of a magnetic core to sum a number of inputs and settle to a single output state. The various logical functions were achieved by linearly adding the input signals on control lines and generating an output signal if the sum exceeded a fixed threshold, defined by the saturation property of the magnetic core. This process came to be known as "Ballot Box Logic" due to the way the inputs created a majority-rule on the output. One difference between magnetic logic and conventional tube or transistor systems is that it is the current that defines the logic levels, not voltage.

Since the magnetic cores were open in the middle, any number of control lines could be threaded through them. This was particularly useful when implementing a best two-out-of-three, a common logic circuit used in binary adders. Another possibility is to use the same core as the switching element in several different portions of the machines logic. For instance, a single core could be used as part of the system that reads instructions from memory, and then again as part of the ALU, as long as both functions don't operate at the same time (as they would in an instruction pipeline).

Interest in magnetic amplifiers lasted only a short time through the 1950s. When they were first being studied, transistors were expensive and unreliable devices, but the introduction of new manufacturing techniques in the late 1950s started to address both of these problems. In spite of their other advantages, magnetic amplifiers quickly disappeared as transistor based logic became increasingly common, and only a few computers based on these systems were produced.

=== Neuron ===
One group working on the magnetic amplifier design was Gordon Scarrott's team at Ferranti R&D labs in West Gorton, Manchester. This team had a longstanding partnership with Manchester University, after commercializing the Manchester Mark 1 and several follow-on designs.

As the prices of transistors dropped, Ken Johnson, an engineer at the lab, proposed a new type of transistor-based logic that followed the same conventions as the magnetic amplifiers, namely that binary logic was based on current levels instead of voltages. Like the magnetic amplifiers, Johnson's design could be used to control several different inputs. Better yet, the system often required only one transistor per logic element, whereas conventional voltage-based logic often required two or more. Although transistors were falling in price they were still expensive, so a machine based on Johnson's design might offer similar performance at a much lower price. He dubbed the concept "Neuron" due to its resemblance to the neurons in the brain.

Interest in Neuron was high, and the team decided to build a small machine to test it, known as "Newt", for "Neuron test". This machine was successful, and the lab was so impressed that they decided to expand the testbed into a complete computer. The result was the Sirius, which was much less expensive than similar machines using traditional transistor logic. Sirius was announced on 19 May 1959 with claims that it would be the smallest and most economically priced computer in the European market. The Sirius was marketed in England for £20,000, a deal compared to its competitors, the Elliott 803 at £35,000 and the ICT 1301 at £120,000. About 20 were produced in total.

=== Orion ===
Convinced that Neuron was a major advance, Ferranti R&D proposed a much larger machine based on the same logic, one that would have even greater price advantages over traditional designs. The new machine was aimed at the business market, not their traditional high-performance niche, and Prudential plc signed up as a launch customer while several other large insurance firms followed. Emerging as the Ferranti Orion in 1961, the system proved to be a disaster. As the machine was much larger than the Sirius physically, it had longer wire runs and thus required larger currents to operate the Neurons. Electrical noise and settling times were major issues, and Orion was much slower than promised.

Engineers at other Ferranti offices were concerned about the Neuron-based design from the start, but were never able to convince management to stop the effort. When Orion failed, these teams were able to convince Prudential that they could deliver a machine five times as fast at the same price point within three years. A ground-up redesign using traditional transistor logic followed and emerged in 1964 as the Orion 2. However, the losses caused by the Orion project were too great for management's taste, and the computer divisions had already been sold off to International Computers and Tabulators in October 1963.

== Description ==
The Sirius was based on decimal numbers stored as 4 binary digits each, or "binary-coded decimal", a useful design for many tasks that the Neuron circuits allowed to be implemented inexpensively. Numbers were stored as a string of ten decimal digits in one of eight accumulators, along with a parity bit. The computer words could also be used to store half of a double-length number, or five characters.

The accumulators were backed by what Ferranti called a "single-level store", a main memory formed out of a series of torsional delay-line memory elements storing 50 words each. Machines were normally supplied with 1,000 words, but this could be expanded through additional cabinets with 3,000 words each to reach a total of 10,000 words. Normally the first 200 words were used to store library routines.

The instruction set was a single-address format stored in single decimal digits of a word, containing a 6-digit address, a 2-digit instruction code, and 1-digit specifying the "A" and "B" accumulators. In most instructions the contents of the B register, treated as an index register, were added to the address field and the contents of that memory location were processed and output to A. For instance, instruction "01" subtracted the contents of the addressed location from A and wrote the result back to A. As the Sirius used decimals for storage, the system offered a number of instructions that quickly multiplied the input or output by 10, by shifting the numbers in the accumulators. The Sirius was also supplied with a version of Autocode adapted from the Ferranti Pegasus, and Autocode programs from the Pegasus could be run on the Sirius "with very little alteration."

The computer operated at 500 kHz, but because each digit was stored as 4 bits, the basic word operational cycle was 80 microseconds. The ALU was serial, so addition or subtraction took 240 microseconds, and overall processing speed was about 4,000 operations a second. General multiplication or division took between 4 and 10 milliseconds, averaging 8. Although this is relatively slow, even for the era, Ferranti boasted that "The Sirius computer is nearly twice as fast as any other existing computer at its price, both as regards speeds of input and output and speeds of computation."

Operator input was provided in the form of a box with 10 columns of digits in the center with buttons for each number from 0 to 10. A single column on the left was used to select an accumulator, and the other than to input the ten digit value. There was a row of command keys on the right. Output consisted of two ten-digit displays using nixie tubes on the front of the machine, which also featured a large electric clock.

All machines were also supplied with a Ferranti TR5 or TR7 photo-electric paper tape reader that read at 300 characters a second, and a slower Teletype paper tape printer (no speed is given, likely 110). Further input/output was offered through two input and two output channels, normally connected to a five-way switch box that allowed the operator to select which devices were fed to which channels. Magnetic tape, punched card, printers and other common I/O devices were supported through these channels.

The machine was designed to fit into small offices with a minimum of support. It required 5 amps of standard 50 Hz 240 V mains power, the only concern being that it was "free from excessive fluctuations". The case was only 10 inches deep, 4 foot 9 inches high, and 6 foot 9 inches across. This size was chosen to allow it to be placed directly behind a standard office desk, and the power supply was positioned so it projected into the knee-hole area. The reader and input box were normally placed on the desk, while the paper tape punch, a relatively large machine, was separate and sized to provide an even desktop.

It weighed about 560 pounds (250 kg).
