= Ferranti-Packard =

Defunct Canadian manufacturer of electronic displays

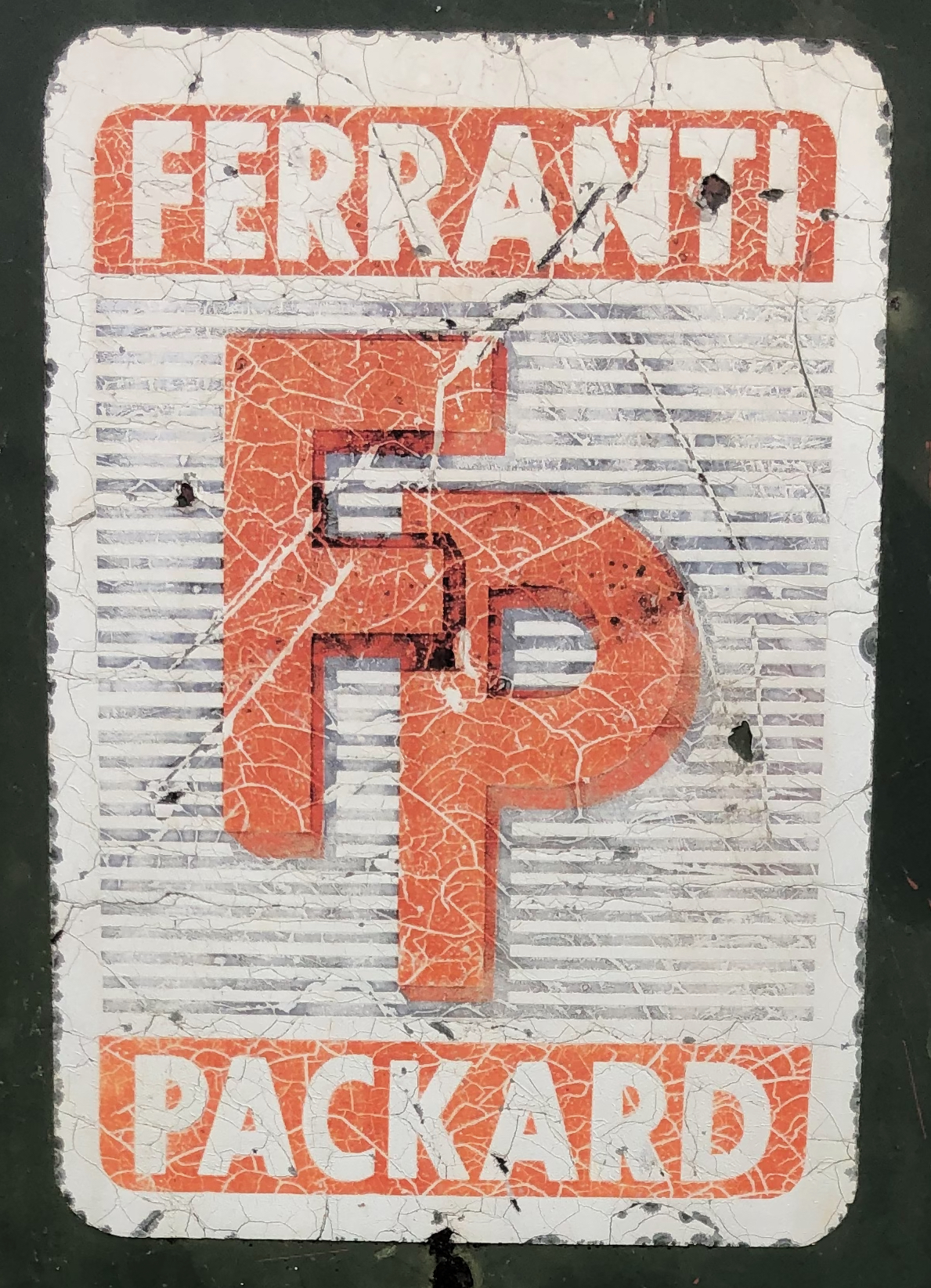
Ferranti-Packard logo seen on a 1970s-era transformer.

Ferranti-Packard Ltd. was the Canadian division of Ferranti's global manufacturing empire, formed by the 1958 merger of Ferranti Electric and Packard Electric. For several years in the post-war era, the company underwent a dramatic expansion and had several brushes with success in the computer market, but eventually shed various divisions and returned to being an electrical grid supplier once again. The company was purchased in 1998 by the Austrian company, VA TECH. On July 23, 2005 Siemens PTD purchased VA Tech's Transmission and Distribution Division (T&D) group for transformers and switchgear.

== History ==
=== Early years ===
Packard Electric had first been set up in 1894 in order to supply transformers during the Niagara Falls hydroelectric developments. Ferranti Canada had first been set up in 1912, acting primarily as a sales and distribution arm for their British designed electrical products.

=== World War II ===
Prior to World War II, Canada's economy was primarily agricultural. While this allowed it to raise a fairly large army with relative ease, it also meant that it was unable to arm itself. C.D. Howe, Minister of Armaments, started an ambitious plan to heavily industrialize the country, turning it almost overnight into what is today a G8 nation.

Canada had entered World War II completely unprepared, and in the post-war era decided they would not allow this to happen again. However, as the art of war turned increasingly technical, it was clear that Canada did not have the wherewithal to support a full program of research on its own. In 1947, the Defense Research Board (DRB) was formed, and sent out a letter outlining their ideas for sharing research between the armed forces, industry and academia.

=== Vincent Ziani de Ferranti ===
The letter made its way to the desk of Vincent Ziani de Ferranti, the then-current CEO of the family-held British company. At the time, Ferranti in the UK was involved in a similar commercial/academic development project with Manchester University to build the Manchester Mark 1 computer, so it seemed that their Canadian division would naturally be able to do the same. In October 1948, he flew to Canada to meet with the DRB. He was disappointed to learn that the DRB did not have the financial resources to fund any sort of program, but Ferranti remained interested, even though it appeared the only way to work with the DRB would be for free.

=== Jim Belyea ===
Just such a project started soon after, when word of the Ferranti meeting reached Lt Jim Belyea, a researcher in the Royal Canadian Navy's electrical labs (Electrical Engineer-in-Chief's Directorate). He had been proposing a completely automated system for ships to pass around tactical data from radar and sonar, to help organize the defence of a convoy under attack by submarines. Belyea presented his ideas to Ferranti, who agreed to start development of the technologies needed. By 1950, they had successfully developed a PCM-based radio system for passing digital data between ships, and the DRB started to become very interested. Full-scale development of the system, known as DATAR, started in February 1951 and underwent trials in late 1953. However, the cost of developing a production version was well beyond what the Royal Canadian Navy was able to afford. They attempted to sell the system to the United States Navy, but they were uninterested and the Canadians were forced to end the project. The US Navy later decided that they needed just such a system, having a rather unhappy experience with their Naval Tactical Data System in 1958.

=== Experimental computer ===
During this period, some time in 1951, Ferranti Canada also considered commercializing the University of Toronto's experimental UTEC computer, which seemed considerably less complex than the Mark I being developed in England. This effort also ended when in 1952, the University purchased a surplus Mark I originally intended for the UK's nuclear weapons program which had suffered massive budget cuts with a change of government.

=== Electronic mail sorting ===
In 1956, the company received a contract from the Canadian Post Office to develop an electronic mail sorting system, which they delivered later that year. The system used a hard-wired transistorized computer that stored a table of postal codes on a magnetic drum. Operators were presented with envelopes and typed in the postal code, which their typewriter printed onto the envelope as a bar code in fluorescent ink. The sorting system would then read the bar code and automatically route it. The system was a complete success.

This system so impressed visitors from the US Post Office that they decided they needed one of their own. They also decided to develop their own system instead of simply buying the Ferranti one, delaying their entry into automated sorting until 1960. A Canada-wide expansion using Ferranti's existing system soon ended in the 1957 election, whose main issue was rampant Liberal spending, including Ferranti's "million dollar monster".

=== Cheque sorting ===
Oddly, the system was later adapted for cheque sorting by the Federal Reserve Bank in New York, who took delivery of an almost identical machine in 1958, based on reading MICR digits instead of bar codes. This MICR-based concept was originally developed by SRI International in 1952 for their similar ERMA project, but they did not manage to actually deliver their machine until 1959. There was some talk of developing the Ferranti system into a commercial line, but it became clear that as general purpose computers fell in price, a single mass-produced model would soon be able to outperform a custom-built design, even on cost. Honeywell started shopping around for just such a system at about this time.

=== ReserVec ===
Another brush with success came in 1959 with the ReserVec on-line reservation system developed for Trans-Canada Air Lines. This product suffered from stiff competition from IBM's SABRE system in the US, but there was nothing similar in the UK, whose own airlines were in the market for such a system. Apparently due largely to not-invented-here problems, Ferranti in the UK decided to develop an entirely new system to fill this need, instead of using the Canadian version.

=== Ferranti Orion computer ===
But by this time, Ferranti's UK computer divisions were themselves in turmoil. Their attempt to commercialize the Atlas design was dragging on, and meanwhile sales of their older Mercury were drying up. In order to address this, as well as move into a new market segment, they decided to launch a newer system aimed at the low-end of the market. The result was the Ferranti Orion, which used an entirely new circuitry system known as "Neuron". This proved to be somewhat of a disaster, and only 12 Orion I machines ever shipped (the first went to AB Turitz and Co., of Gothenburg, Sweden, in March 1963).

=== Orion II ===
Meanwhile, Ferranti-Packard decided they should set up production for the Atlas machine as well, but after successfully securing loans from the government they were astounded to learn that the UK division refused to allow them access to the design. Many of the company's engineers resigned in disgust, although some were later convinced to stay on. The UK division then asked several Canadian engineers to move to England in an attempt to re-engineer the Orion based on ReserVec's transistorized circuits. Known as Orion II, the project ran in parallel to the original Orion for some time. (Orion II was much more successful, both technically and commercially, than its predecessor. Nearly 40 machines were delivered by the end of 1964.)

=== Ferranti-Packard 6000 ===
With the experience gained during Orion II the engineers returned to Toronto convinced that ReserVec's design sold into the Orion's marketplace would be a commercial success. Once again approaching the Federal Reserve Bank, they proposed to build a new machine to replace the earlier post-office-derived system. The Bank accepted the proposal, and work on what would become the Ferranti-Packard 6000 started in late 1961. This joint venture with Pitney-Bowes was one of five MICR trials at various FRB districts. The system was delivered in early 1963 and removed a year later.

In order to differentiate themselves from the numerous models in this performance range, the FP-6000 would directly support multitasking, then known as multiprogramming, as well as be highly modular. The prototype machine was completed in 1962, and was delivered to the FRB in early 1963. Further sales proved difficult however. One was purchased by the DRB's station in Dartmouth, Nova Scotia, another by the Toronto Stock Exchange, one by Saskatchewan Power, and a final machine by a research facility in Dalkeith, bringing the total to five sales.

=== International Computers and Tabulators ===
Meanwhile, unknown to Ferranti-Packard, Ferranti in the UK had decided to cut their losses and exit the commercial computer business. In early 1963, they approached International Computers and Tabulators with the proposal to sell off their commercial division. Perhaps unsurprisingly, ICT found the proposal unattractive. When they learned of the FP-6000 their attitude changed, and they eventually agreed to the purchase under the stipulation that rights to the FP-6000 would be transferred from Canada. The FP-6000 then became the basis for ICT 1900 series machines, which eventually sold into the thousands.

After the ICT takeover, Ferranti-Packard proposed that they manufacture several models of the 1900-series, as well as serve as a gateway into the North American market. ICT, however, was interested in Europe only. Most of the FP-6000 engineers soon left the company, forming ESE Limited and Teklogix. The programmers founded I. P. Sharp Associates in December 1964.

=== Flip-disc display ===
One of the Canadian company's developments was the flip-disc display, which creates a large display out of a grid of small disks, painted black on one side and some bright color (typically yellow) on the other. A small magnet glued to the disk responded to a magnetic pulse from a coil which surrounded the disk. The direction of current through the coil determined the side to display. A display system was sold to the Montreal and Canadian stock exchanges in 1964. The UK headquarters gave the invention little note, but it became somewhat successful in spite of this, and HQ eventually used it as a way to try to sell off the Canadian division in the 1970s. In addition Air Canada commenced use at all its baggage claims, but also used for Flight information displays, starting with its new terminal at the Kennedy Terminal in New York. Today, these displays can commonly be found in outdoor use, notably on highway signage and in the automotive application of destination signs for public service vehicles. It was also installed at the Chicago Board of Trade, the Chicago Mercantile Exchange, World Trade Center, United Airlines baggage handling system at DFW airport, as well as Michigan, Illinois, Pennsylvania Departments of Transportation and New York Port Authority as changeable message signs for traffic control. It was also used for many sporting events such as horse racing, track and field events, as well as Olympic events. It was also used as the game board display on Family Feud from 1976 to 1995.

=== Development of the Barcode ===
A later patented development was the first barcode scanner. Originally developed for Simpsons Sears catalog center in Toronto in 1968, the bar code was developed to minimize any increase in Customer picking ticket area. Sears Toronto was then printing 360,000/day. The system used two large pre-printed red bars which could carry normal text with the barcode printed between them. The scanner searched for the bars in green light where the red appears as black. The red bars allowed electronic re-orientation of the scanning system to set-off a white flash which temporarily burned the barcode image unto the photosurface of the scanner. This system was then combined with an electronic tilt tray controller, then produced by Speaker Motion Systems of Milwaukee. The system could read labels passing at 500 ft/minute, 360 degrees of horizontal rotation and +/- 25 degrees of vertical slope. Sears took the first system but it was later sold to most of the major catalogue centres including Sears-Roebuck US - 11 centers, J.C. Penneys - 3 centers, Montgomery Wards, Aldens etc. A single workstation version model, the Datatriever 1000, with integrated electronic US post-office certified attached weigh scales and a label printer, sold 400 units including controlling computers (DEC PDP-8) to Spiegels on one contract for 1.5 times FPs total annual income. A slightly later development used hand held scanners to read the same patented bar-codes. The volume of business was too big for FP to handle and the entire business was sold off to a new US company, Identicon, who eventually sold many more of these systems. All of the models were incorporated into the Simpson-Sears Montreal Fashion Center.

=== Purchase by VA Tech ===
With the electronics division empty, Ferranti-Packard was once again a major electrical vendor only. Over the years, many other specialty divisions were sold off or closed, and eventually all that was left was the original Packard transformer division. It was this that VA Tech purchased, and which later came to be part of Siemens.

=== Corporate Archives ===
The Archives of Ontario holds numerous Ferranti-Packard records that were transferred by Rolls-Royce in 1991, including textual records, photographs, technical drawings, audio reels, films and videocassettes. It also holds material donated in 2002 by Mr. Paul Coleman and in 2006 by Siemens Canada.

The St. Catharines Museum and Welland Canals Centre also holds a collection of material about Ferranti-Packard.
