= Memory operations per second =

Memory operations per second (MOPS) is a metric for an expression of the performance capacity of semiconductor memory. It can also be used to determine the efficiency of RAM in the Windows operating environment. MOPS can be affected by multiple applications being open at once without adequate job scheduling.
