= ReserVec =

Computerized reservation system

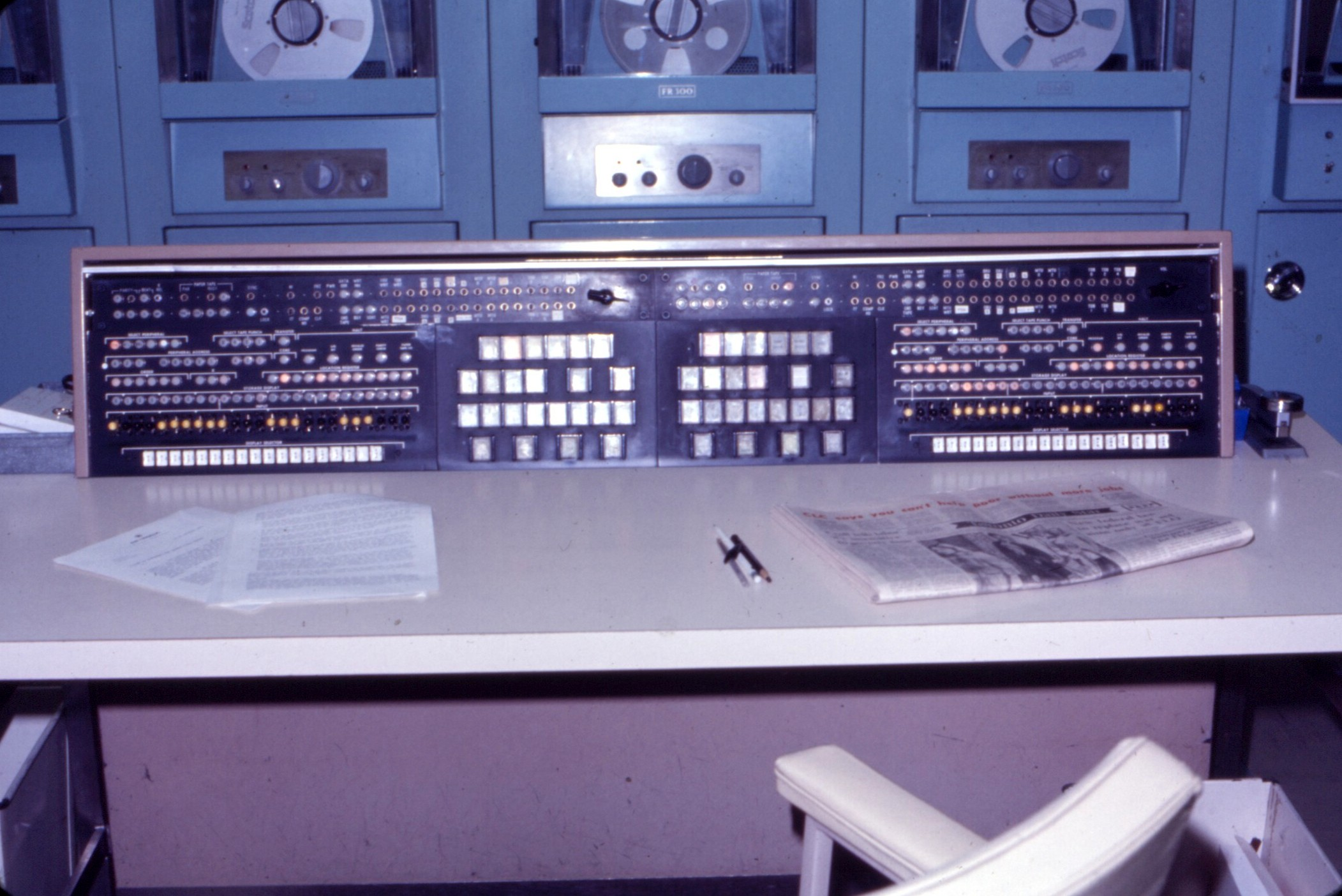
Castor and Pollux (Gemini) Consoles

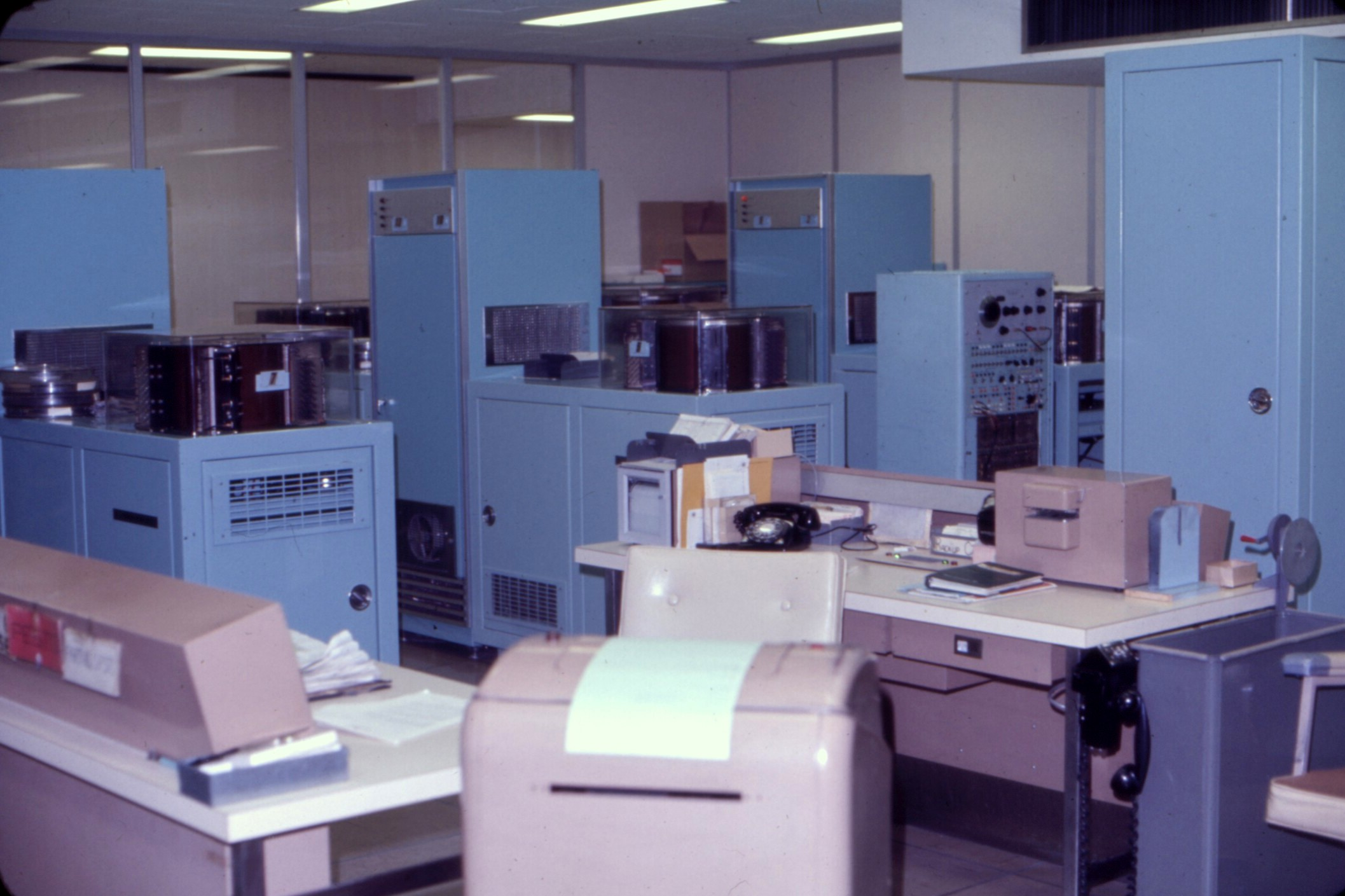
Drum Storage

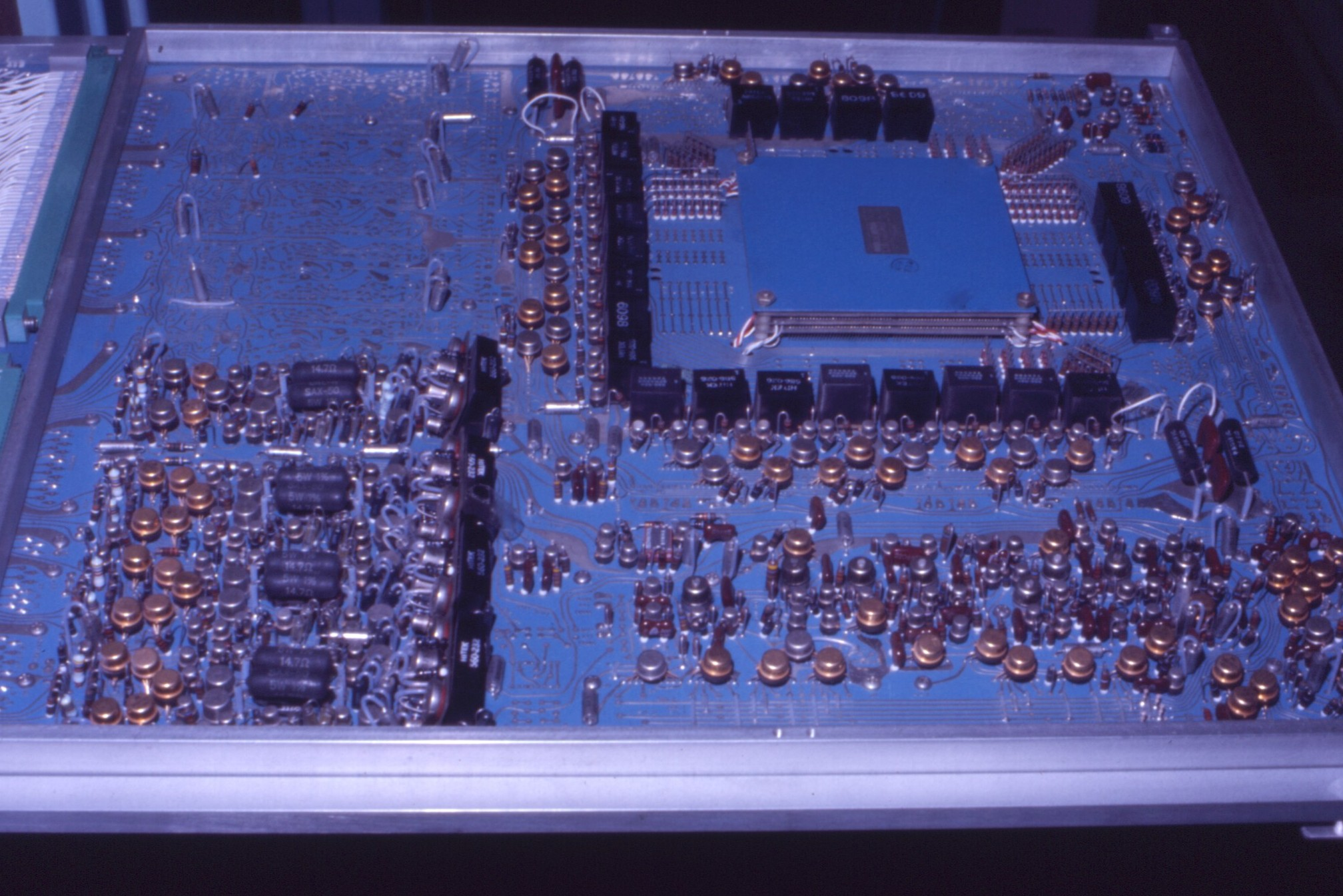
CPU Core Memory Expansion

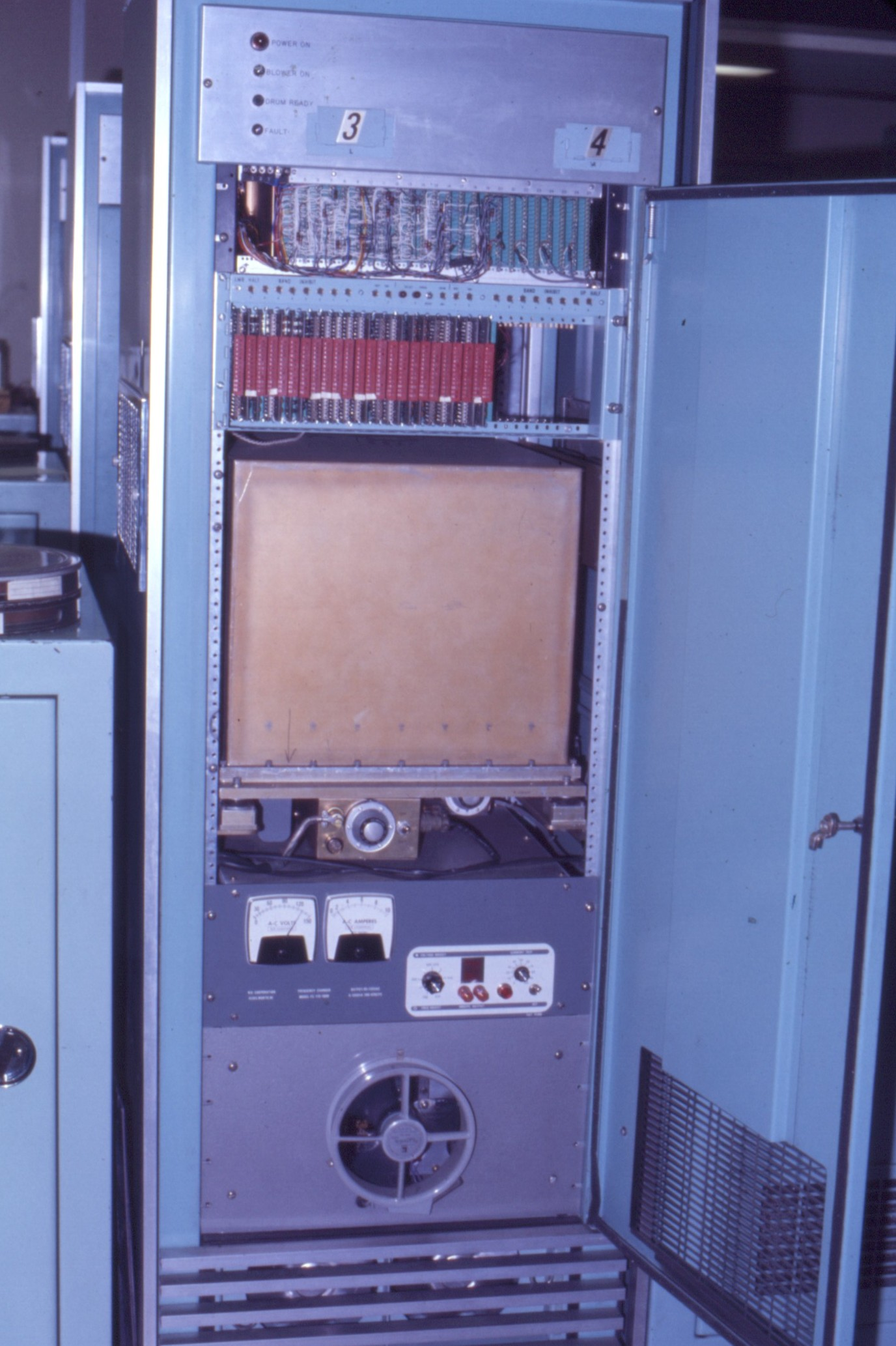
Vermont Research Drum Storage

ReserVec was a computerized reservation system developed by Ferranti Canada for Trans-Canada Air Lines (today's Air Canada) in the late 1950s. It appears to be the first such system ever developed, predating the more famous SABRE system in the United States by about two years. Although Ferranti had high hopes, that the system would be used by other airlines, no further sales were forthcoming and development of the system ended. Major portions of the transistor-based circuit design were put to good use in the Ferranti-Packard 6000 computer, which would later go on to see major sales in Europe as the ICT 1904.

== Background ==
In the early 1950s the airline industry was undergoing explosive growth. A serious limiting factor was the time taken to make a single booking, which could take upwards of 90 minutes in total. Trans-Canada Air Lines (TCA) found their bookings typically involved between three and seven calls to the centralized booking centre in Toronto, where telephone operators would scan flight status displayed on a huge board showing all scheduled flights one month into the future. Bookings past that time could not be made, nor could an agent reliably know anything other than if the flight was full or not – to book two seats was much more complex, requiring the operator to find the "flight card" for that flight in a filing cabinet.

In 1946 American Airlines decided to tackle this problem through automation, introducing the Reservisor, a simple electromechanical computer based on telephone switching systems. Newer versions of the Reservisor included magnetic drum systems for storing flight information further into the future. The ultimate version of the system, the Magnetronic Reservisor, was installed in 1956 and could store data for 2,000 flights a day up to one month into the future. Reservisors were later sold to a number of airlines, as well as Sheraton for hotel bookings, and Goodyear for inventory control.

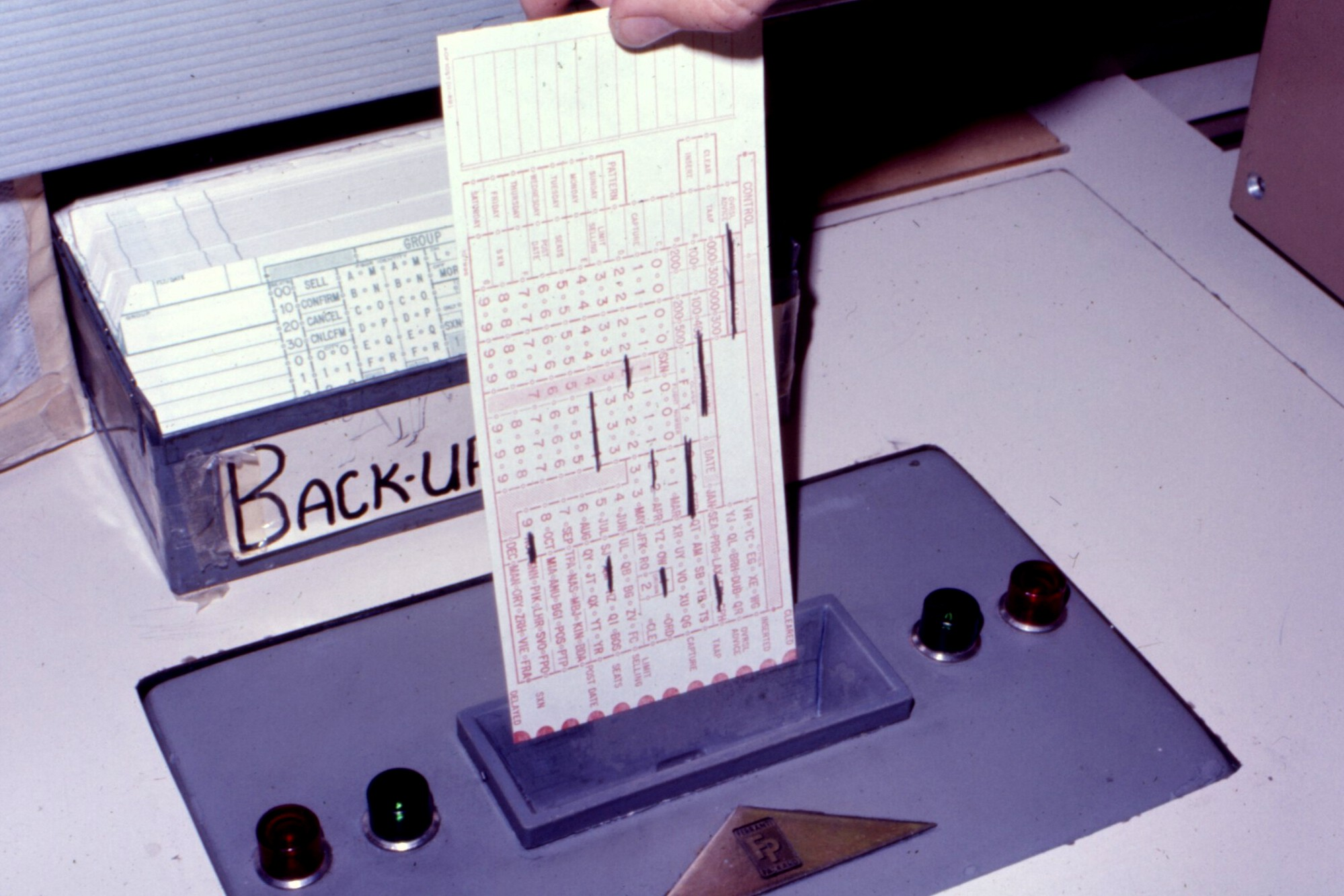
Transactor

== TCA experiments ==
TCA was aware of the Reservisor, but was unimpressed by its limited capabilities in terms of information it could store, and even more by the failure rate, which was essentially "constant". Nor did the Reservisor really change the way the reservations system worked; ticket agents still had to call central booking and talk (typically through an intermediary) to a Reservisor operator to answer queries.

TCA asked one of their communications engineers, Lyman Richardson, to study the booking problem, and he quickly came to the opinion that a computerized solution was the only one worth studying. TCA then entered into an agreement to build a prototype system on the University of Toronto's FERUT computer, a surplus Manchester Mark 1 computer they had received in 1952 when the UK's nuclear weapons laboratories had to abandon it after budget cuts.

The FERUT-based system was demonstrated in 1953 and was a qualified success; while the programmed logic and data storage/retrieval worked well, input/output was a serious bottleneck that seemed to make the system no better than the mechanical Reservisor. Furthermore, the Ferut was vacuum tube based, and thus no more reliable than the Reservisor, TCA's major concern prior to the experiment.

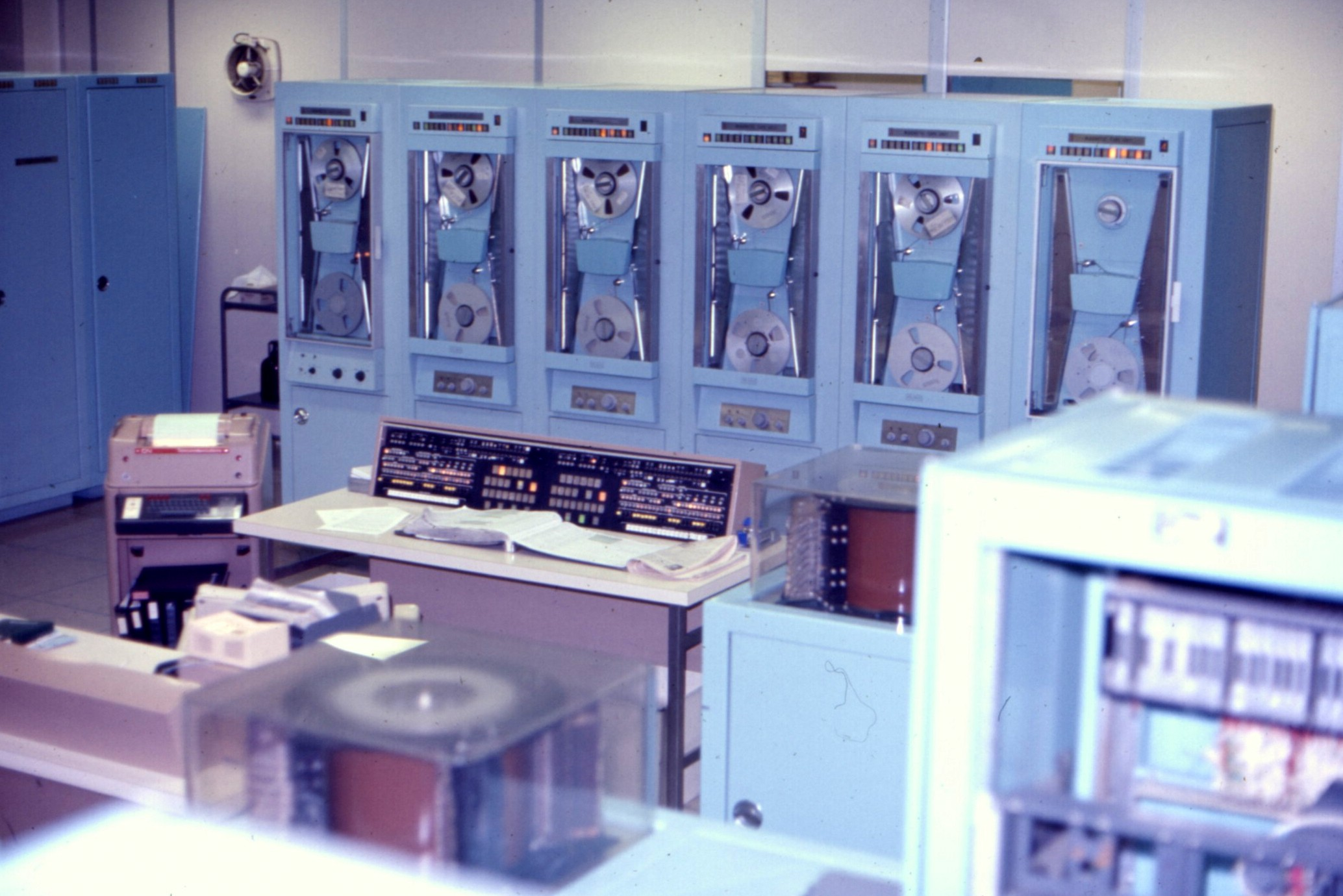
Reservec Console, Tape Drives, Drums, CPU

Richardson was convinced that the basic concept was sound, and formed a team of him and several engineers from the university's Computation Center, operating under the aegis of Adalia Ltd., a consulting firm set up by Robert Watson-Watt of radar fame when he moved to Montreal at the end of World War II. They became involved with the newly-forming electronics group at Ferranti Canada, who felt they had a solution to the input/output and reliability problems.

Ferranti proposed a "transactor" (terminal) that used a custom punched card system. Booking agents at the ticketing offices marked the cards with a pencil to select various checkboxes, then inserted it into the transactor which read the marks and punched those codes onto the edge of the card. Cards would then be collected from any number of operators and fed into a normal card reader, which would read them over telephone lines at "high speed" directly into the central booking computer.

The computer would be built using transistor-based logic, thereby eliminating downtime due to tube burnout. Such a system had first been proposed in order to improve the reliability of the DATAR system Ferranti had built for the Canadian Navy, and they were convinced of its practicality.

TCA was interested and provided $75,000 for the construction of six prototype transactors. In 1957 these were attached to FERUT over telephone lines and the experimental booking program run again. The demonstration was a complete success; users could quickly feed in requests and Ferut was able to book, change, query and cancel flights at speeds that made the Reservisor look terribly slow.

== Deployment ==
There was some further development and planning, but in 1959 TCA placed a $2 million ($12 million in year-2000 dollars) contract for a deployment system consisting of 350 transactors and all the communications equipment to support them in the field. Ferranti also won the contract for the computer system, although IBM had also been considered. The new machine was based on a 25-bit word, using one bit for parity checking and 24 bits for data, and was equipped with 4,096 words of core memory (12 kB in modern terms), later expanded to 8,192 words. Storage consisted of five magnetic drums (one was a spare) with 32,768 25-bit words each, and six tape units. Simple load balancing software routed requests across two CPUs, known as Castor and Pollux, the computer as a whole thus becoming Gemini. An internal TCA contest in late 1960 to name the system as a whole resulted in ReserVec for Reservations Electronically Controlled.

Installation of the transactors started in April 1961, followed by the computer in the Toronto booking office in August. The system was brought up for testing on October 18, 1961, connecting additional ticketing offices as the transactors were installed over the next year. By August 1962 the system was complete, and the switch-over from the manual systems to ReserVec was completed on January 24, 1963. Use of ReserVec reduced the head count at the booking office from 230 to 90, and allowed for the sale of thousands of telephone lines formerly needed to reach the human operators. Total turnaround from request to response could be as short as a second, although under load it might drop to two seconds at the worst. The system as a whole could process 10 transactions per second.

It is interesting to compare the system with SABRE, being deployed at about the same time by American Airlines. SABRE was first started as an experimental effort in 1953, and a formal development contract signed in 1957. The system was first turned on in 1960, and took over booking functions in December 1964. So while the two projects started at the same time, ReserVec was completed almost two years earlier. While the ReserVec cost $4 million, SABRE was ten times that. Equally interesting is that while the SABRE CPU was about ten times faster, ReserVec handled 80-100,000 transactions a day with a maximum two second delay, while SABRE handled only 26,000 with delays of up to three seconds.

Unlike SABRE, however, ReserVec did not store passenger information, which had to be processed manually. In order to address this need, TCA added a second system known as Pioneer, which could link ReserVec's three letter passenger codes with the full passenger records held on a Burroughs D-82 computer (originally designed for US military use). Pioneers were installed only in the Toronto and Montreal offices, smaller offices continued using paper records for user info.

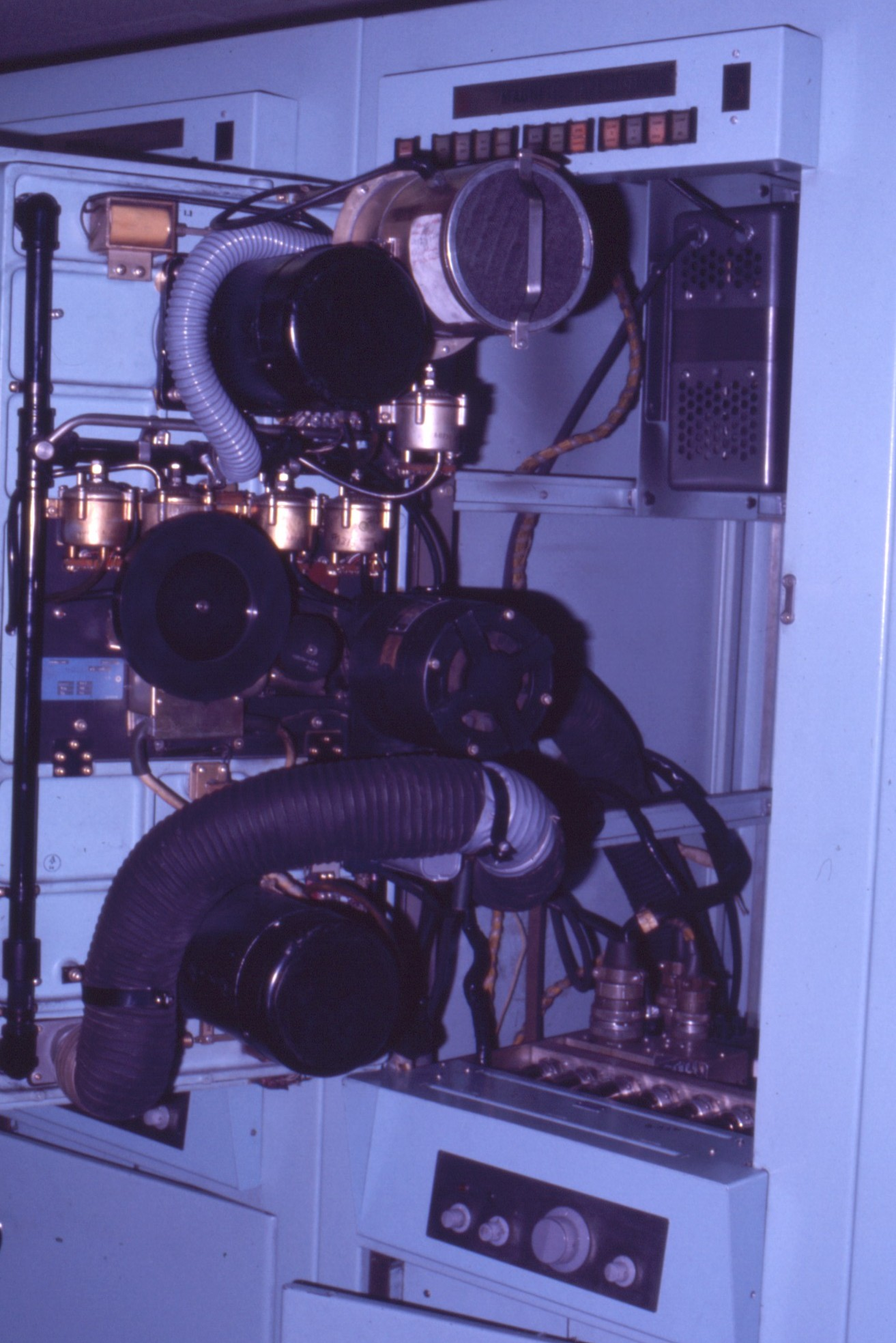
Ampex Tape Drive Interior

ReserVec ran all of TCA's reservations for nine years, with an average downtime of only 120 seconds a year. Originally designed for only 60,000 transactions a day, it was already processing 80 to 100,000 when it was first turned on, and over 600,000 by 1970. Retroactively named ReserVec I, the system was finally replaced at the end of 1970 by a new Univac-based system known as ReserVec II, which featured small computer terminals replacing the punched card systems.

== Disappointing sales ==
Ferranti, now as Ferranti-Packard, tried to sell the machine as-is to other airlines. The United States market seemed to be entirely wrapped up by IBM and Univac, but there was no comparable system in Europe, where a number of airlines were looking at the U.S. developments with interest. Gemini could be sold directly into Europe by Ferranti's existing UK-based sales force. Instead, the UK headquarters decided to build their own solution from scratch. In the end, the UK system would never be delivered; it was still being developed when Ferranti decided to sell off their entire computer division after years of losses.

Nevertheless, the work did not go to waste. The engineering team convinced Canadian management to support the development of a business computer aimed at the low-end of the mainframe market. They expanded the ReserVec system with additional hardware to directly support multitasking and various changes to make the system highly modular, making it more attractive to a wider variety of users. Sales of the new Ferranti-Packard 6000 were just starting when the UK headquarters used the design to sweeten the deal when selling off their UK computer divisions, handing the design to the ICT who took over production. This was much to the chagrin of the Canadian staff, most of whom quit. The FP-6000 became the ICT 1904, one of a line of similar machines which sold over 3,000 during the 1960s and 1970s.

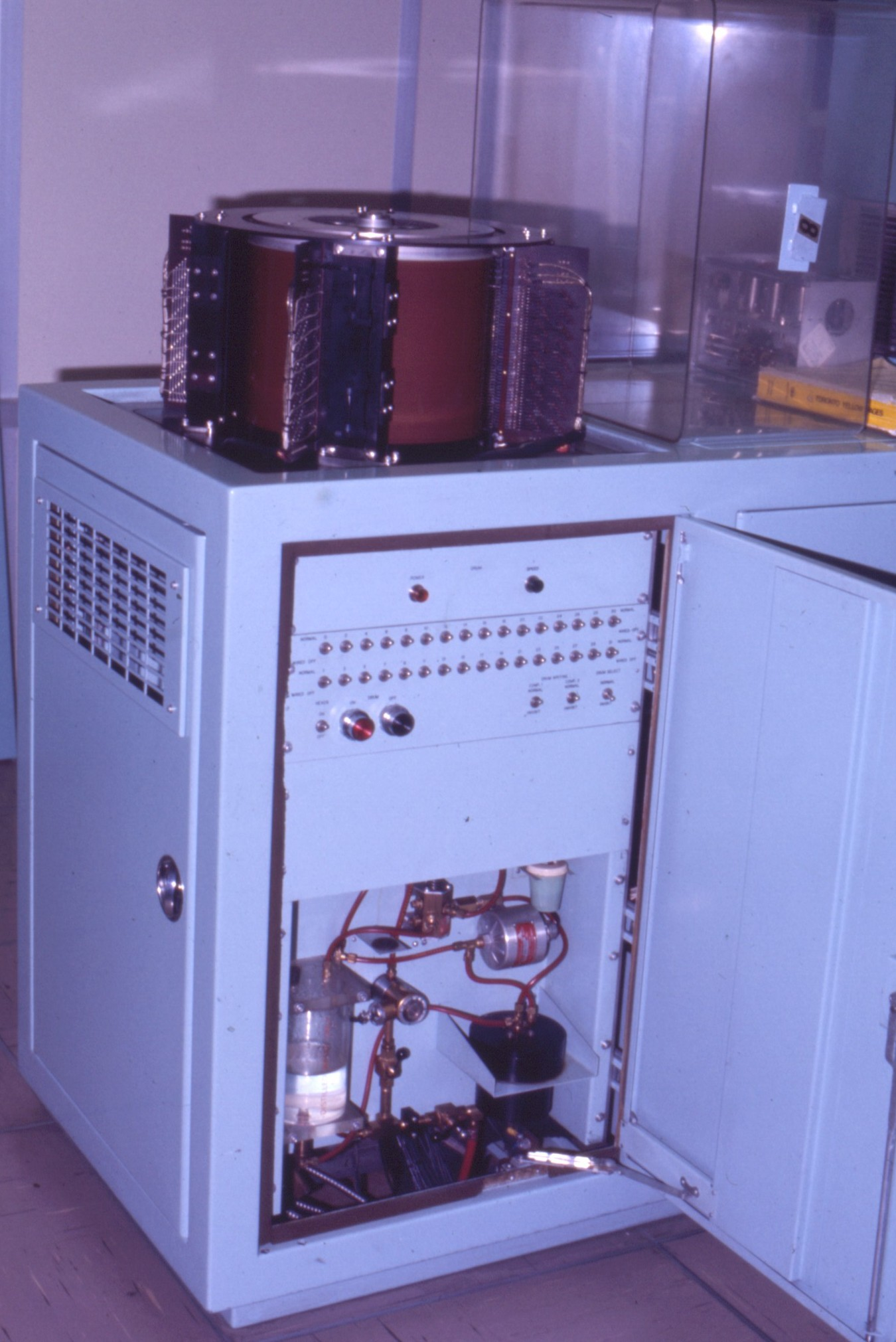
Drum Storage Unit
