= List of British computers =

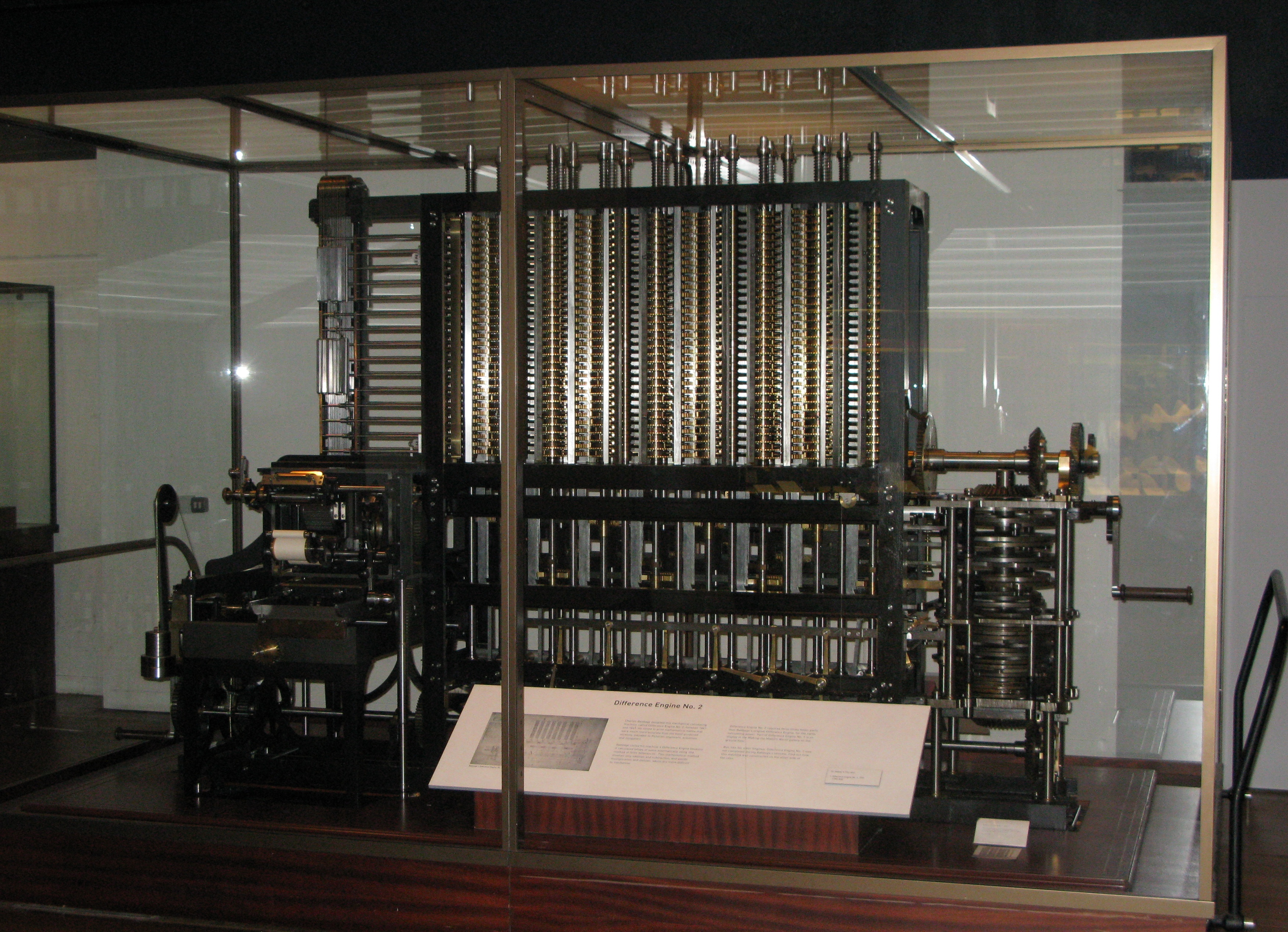
The difference engine built by London's Science Museum's from Charles Babbage's design

Computers designed or built in Britain include:

- Acorn Computers
  - Acorn Eurocard systems
  - Acorn System 1
  - Acorn Atom
  - BBC Micro
  - Acorn Electron
  - BBC Master
  - Acorn Archimedes
  - RiscPC
  - Acorn Network Computer
- Amstrad
  - Amstrad CPC
  - Amstrad PCW
  - Amstrad NC100
  - PC1512
  - PPC 512 and 640
  - Amstrad PC2286
  - Amstrad Mega PC
- Apricot Computers
  - Apricot PC
  - Apricot Portable
  - Apricot Picobook Pro
- Bear Microcomputer Systems
  - Newbear 77-68
- Bywood Electronics
  - SCRUMPI 2
  - SCRUMPI 3
- Cambridge Computer
  - Cambridge Z88
- Camputers Lynx
- CAP computer
- Commodore Amiga 600 (A600) - Assembled in a former Timex factory in Scotland.
- Commodore Amiga 1200 (A1200) - Assembled in a former Timex factory in Scotland.
- Compukit UK101
- Digico Prince
- Dragon 32/64
- Elliott Brothers (computer company)
- Enterprise (computer)
- Ferranti MRT
- Flex machine
- Gemini Computers
  - Gemini Galaxy
  - Gemini Challenger
- GEC
  - GEC 2050
  - GEC 4000 series
  - GEC Series 63
- Grundy NewBrain
- ICL
  - ICL 2900 Series
  - ICL Series 39
  - One Per Desk
- Jupiter Ace
- Memotech MTX
- Nascom
  - Nascom 1
  - Nascom 2
- Plessey System 250
- Raspberry Pi
- Research Machines
  - Research Machines 380Z
  - LINK 480Z
  - RM Nimbus
- SAM Coupé
- Sinclair Research
  - MK14 (trading as Science of Cambridge)
  - ZX80
  - ZX81
  - ZX Spectrum
  - Sinclair QL
- Systime Computers Ltd
  - Systime 1000, 3000, 5000, 8750, 8780
  - Systime Series 2, Series 3
- Tangerine Computer Systems
  - Tangerine Microtan 65
  - Oric-1
  - Oric Atmos
- Tatung Einstein
- Torch Computers
  - Triple X workstation
- Transam
  - Triton
  - Tuscan

== Mechanical computers ==
- Difference engine
  - Analytical Engine
- Bombe

== Early British computers ==
Minicomputer system prices in Britain in 1974
Company	Product (with 4K bytes unless indicated)	Cost for basic processor
Arcturus Electronics	A18-D	£3,350
Computer Technology Ltd	Modular One (8K words)	£8,150
Data General	Nova 820J	£3,725
Digico	Micro 16V	£1,700
Digital Equipment	PDP-8/E	£2,370
Digital Equipment	PDP-11/20	£5,300
Ferranti	Argus 700E (8K words)	£3,450
Ferranti	Argus 500E	£8,700
GEC Computers	2050 (16K bytes)	£3,530
GEC Computers	4080 (64K bytes)	£21,000
Intertechnique	Multi 8/M301	£2,200
Philips	Electrologica P855	£1,590

- AEI 1010
- APEXC
- Atlas (computer)
- Automatic Computing Engine
- Colossus computer
- CTL Modular One
- Digico Micro 16
- EDSAC
  - EDSAC 2
- Elliott Brothers (computer company)
  - Elliott 152
  - Elliott 503
  - Elliott 803
  - Elliott 4100 Series
- EMIDEC 1100
- English Electric
  - English Electric DEUCE
  - English Electric KDF8
  - English Electric KDF9
  - English Electric KDP10
  - English Electric System 4
- Ferranti
  - Ferranti Argus
  - Ferranti Mark 1, or Manchester Electronic Computer
  - Ferranti Mercury
  - Ferranti Orion
  - Ferranti Pegasus
  - Ferranti Perseus
  - Ferranti Sirius
  - Nimrod (computer)
- Harwell computer
  - Harwell CADET
- Hollerith Electronic Computer
- ICS Multum
- ICT
  - ICT 1301
  - ICT 1900 series
- LEO (computer)
- Luton Analogue Computing Engine
- Manchester computers
  - Manchester Mark 1
  - Manchester Baby
- Marconi
  - Marconi Transistorised Automatic Computer (T.A.C.)
  - Marconi Myriad
- Metrovick 950
- MOSAIC
- Pilot ACE
- Royal Radar Establishment Automatic Computer
- SOLIDAC
