= List of transistorized computers =

Digital computers that used discrete transistors as their primary logic elements

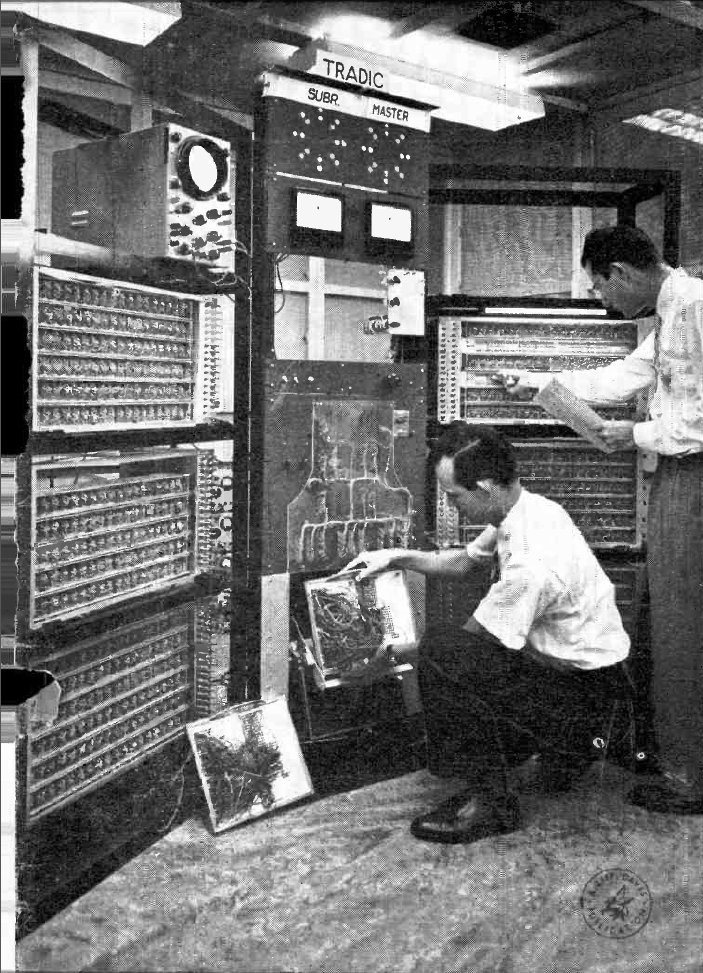
TRADIC

This is a list of transistorized computers, which were digital computers that used discrete transistors as their primary logic elements. Discrete transistors were a feature of logic design for computers from about 1960, when reliable transistors became economically available, until monolithic integrated circuits displaced them in the 1970s. The list is organized by operational date or delivery year to customers. Computers announced, but never completed, are not included. Some very early "transistor" computers may still have included vacuum tubes in the power supply or for auxiliary functions.

== 1950s ==
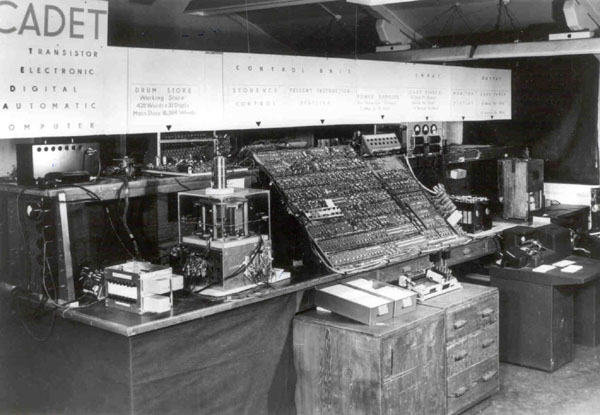
Harwell CADET

=== 1953 ===
- University of Manchester Transistor Computer 1953 (prototype) 1955 (full scale) experimental

=== 1954 ===
- Bell Labs TRADIC for U.S. Air Force

=== 1955 ===
- Harwell CADET demonstrated February 1955, one-off scientific computer

=== 1956 ===
- Electrotechnical Laboratory ETL Mark III (Japan) experimental, began development 1954, completed 1956, Japan's first transistorized stored-program computer
- MIT TX-0
- Metrovick 950

=== 1957 ===
- Burroughs SM-65 Atlas ICBM Guidance Computer MOD1, AN/GSQ-33 (no relation to Manchester ATLAS)
- Ramo-Wooldridge (TRW) RW-30 airborne computer
- Univac TRANSTEC, for US Navy
- Univac ATHENA, US Air Force missile guidance (ground control)
- IBM 608 transistor calculator (its development was preceded by the prototyping of an experimental all-transistor version of the 604 demonstrated in October 1954), announced 1955, first shipped December 1957
- DRTE Computer, Canadian experimental system delivered 1957, added parallel math unit and other improvements in 1960.
- ETL Mark IV computer, upgraded to the ETL Mark IV A in 1958, a transistor-based computer built at the Japanese government's ElectroTechnical Laboratory, inspired almost every Japanese computer company.

=== 1958 ===
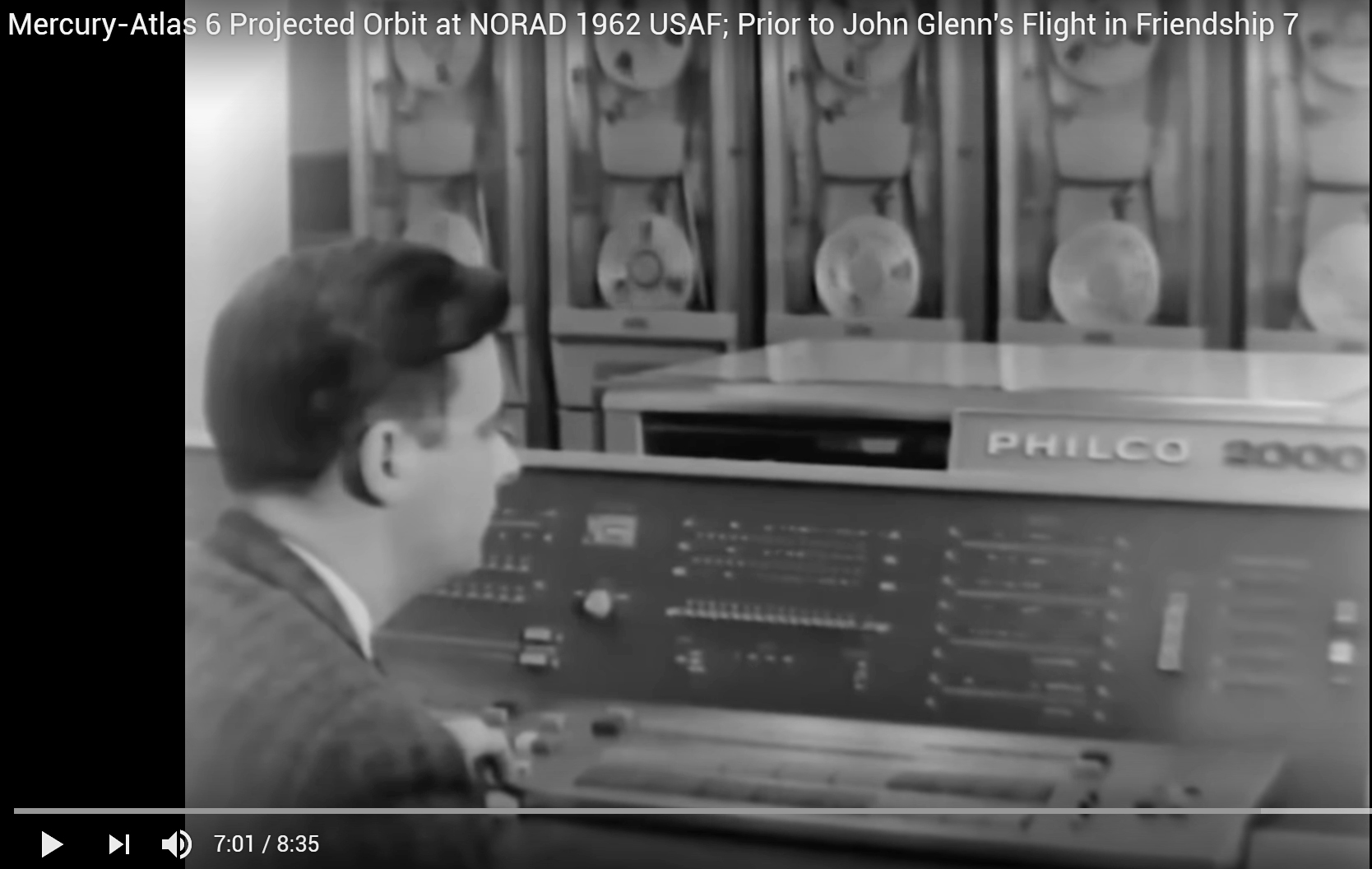
Philco 2000

- Electrologica X1
- TX-2
- UNIVAC Solid State (partially transistorized)
- Philco Transac S-1000 scientific computer- Navy/NSA SOLO, one-off for NSA
- Philco Transac S-2000 electronic data processing computer
- Mailüfterl
- RCA 501 intended as a commercial system but used in military applications
- Siemens System 2002 – Prototype in operation since 1956, first machine was put in operation in 1958.
- Autonetics Recomp II

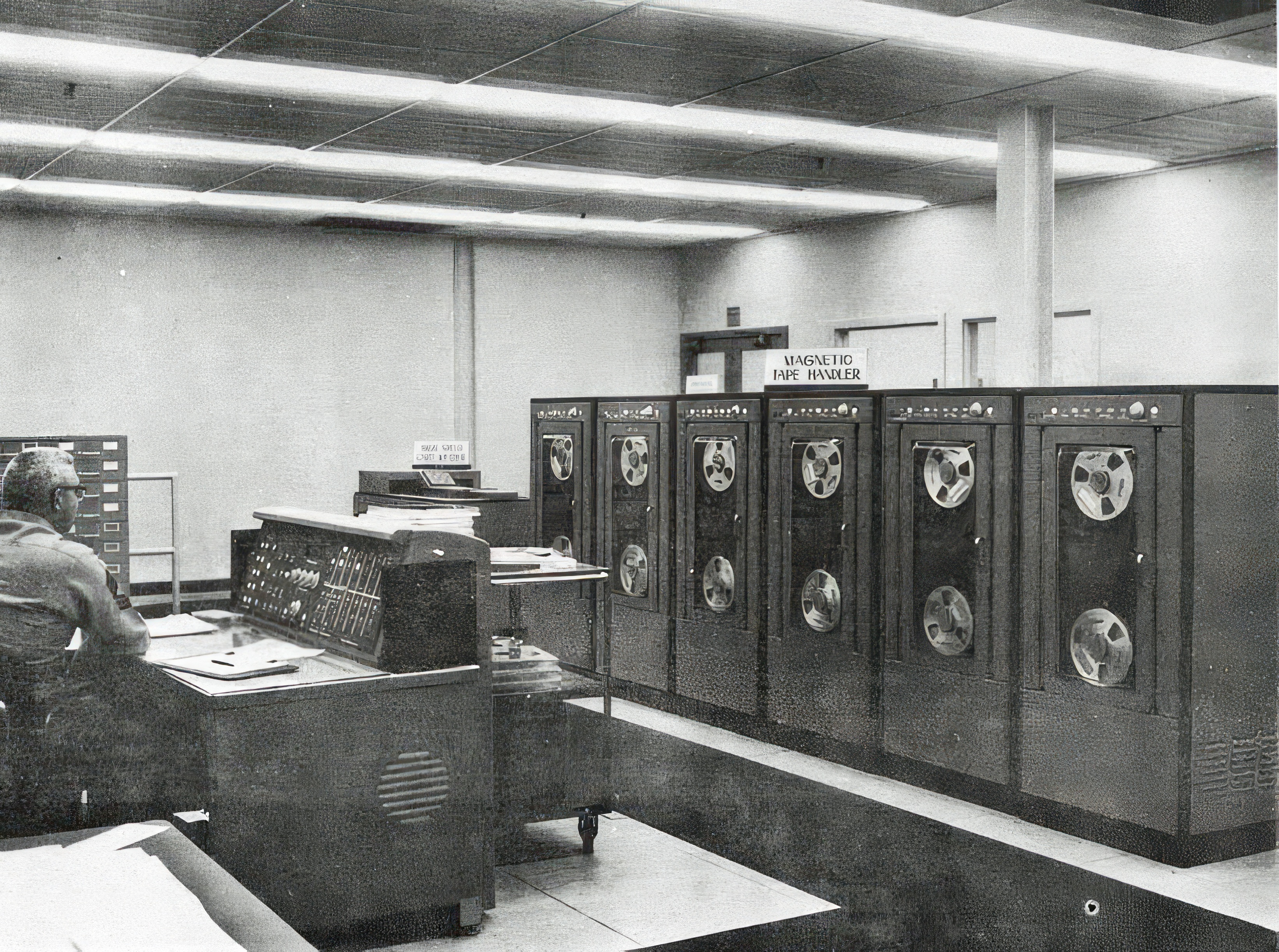
NCR 304

=== 1959 ===
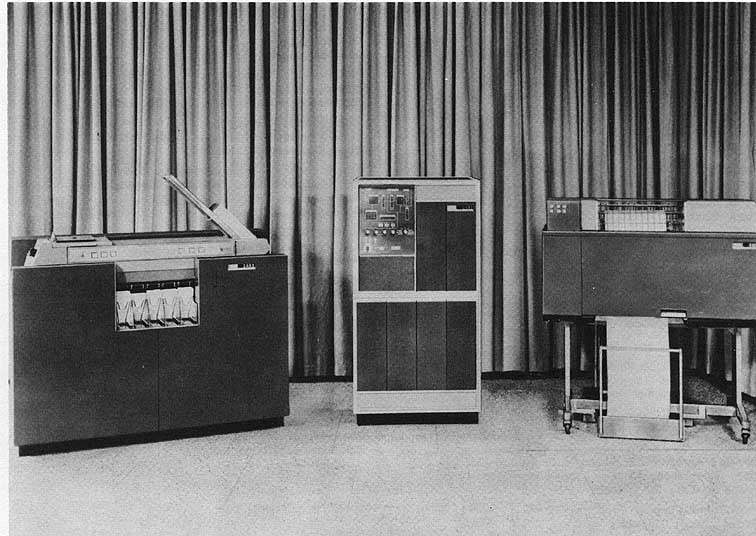
IBM 1401

- NCR 304, announced in 1957, first delivery in 1959
- Olivetti Elea 9003
- Sylvania MOBIDIC
- IBM 7090 (6/60)
- IBM 1401
- IBM 1620 Model I
- NEAC 2201 (NEC)
- EMIDEC 1100
- TRW RW-300
- PDP-1
- Standard Elektrik Lorenz SEL ER 56

== 1960s ==
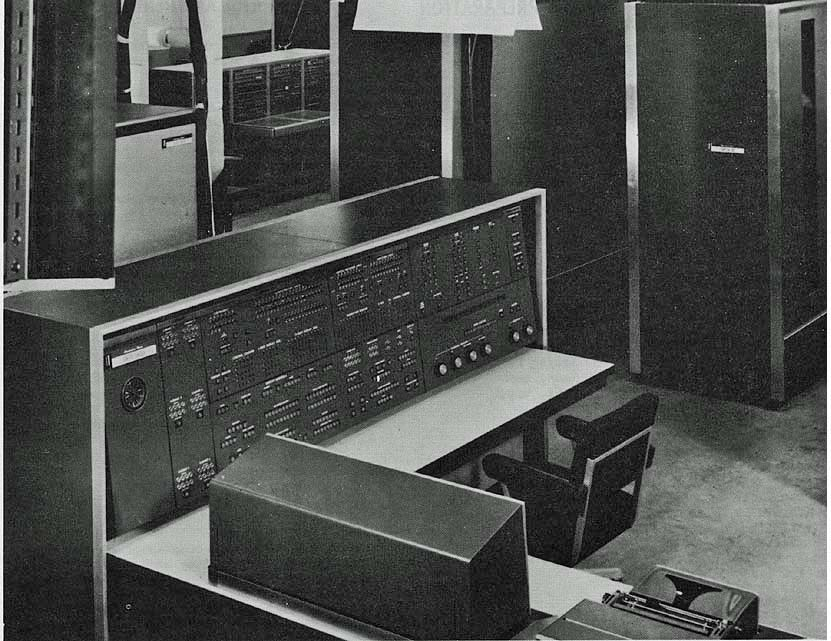
UNIVAC LARC

=== 1960 ===
- AEI 1010
- Bull Gamma 60
- Honeywell 200
- Honeywell 800 first installation 1960
- UNIVAC LARC
- CDC 160 (7/60)
- CDC 1604 (1/60)
- Datasaab D2
- DRTE Computer, expanded version
- Elliott 803
- GE 210
- AN/FSQ-32 (IBM 4020)
- AN/FSQ-31V
- IBM 7070 (6/60)
- Japan Electrotechnical Laboratory ETL Mark V (5/60)
- Mitsubishi MELCOM 3409
- Clary DE-60
- Monroe Calculating Machine Mark XI (or "Monrobot XI")
- Packard Bell Corporation PB 250 (PB250; no relation to the modern brand of personal computers) used, among others, as the controller for hybrid digital/analog system TRICE and HYCOMP 250, and as the control computer for mobile data systems
- Philco TRANSAC S-2000 Model 211
- RCA 301

=== 1961 ===
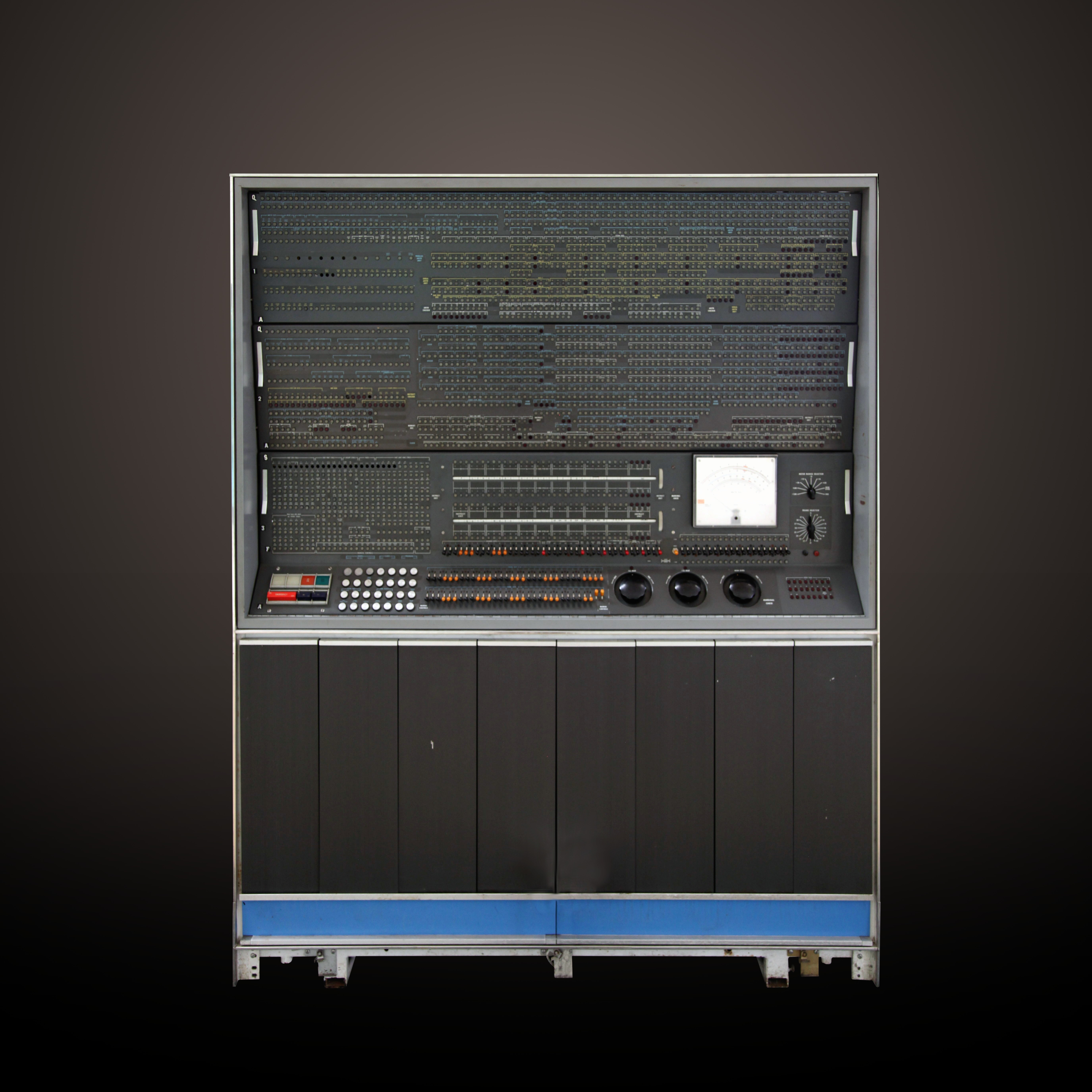
IBM 7030

- Plessey XL4
- MANIAC III
- CAB 500
- LEO III
- English Electric KDP10
- Bendix G-20
- NEC NEAC 2205
- CDC 160A (7/61)
- CDC 924,
- CDC 924A (8/61)
- Fujitsu FACOM 222
- GE-200 series
  - GE-225 1961
  - GE-215 1963
  - GE-205,235 1964
- GE Datanet 30
- Honeywell 400 (12/61)
- IBM 1410
- IBM 7030 Stretch
- IBM 7074 (12/51)
- Zuse Z23
- IBM 7080 (9/61)
- IBM 1710
- Matsushita MADIC IIA
- RCA 301 (2/61)
- TRW-130 aka AN/UYK-1 for Transit submarine navigation satellite receivers
- UNIVAC 490
- Regnecentralen GIER

=== 1962 ===
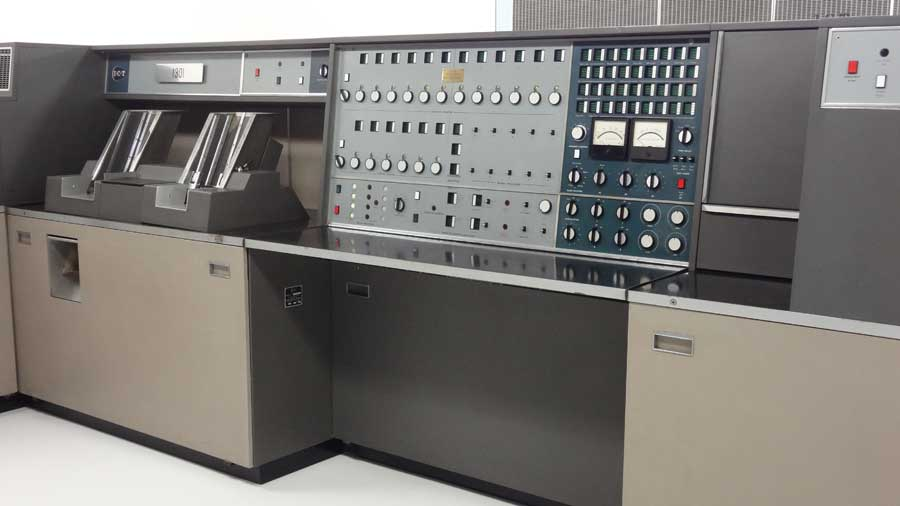
ICT 1301

- Philco TRANSAC S-2000 Model 212
- Atlas Computer (Manchester)
- ASC-15
- Burroughs D825
- CDC 1604-A
- DEC PDP-4
- GE 412 (7/62)
- IBM 1620 Model II
- ICT 1301
- ILLIAC II
- UNIVAC 1004
- UNIVAC 1107
- UNIVAC III
- IBM 7072 (6/62)
- IBM 7094 (9/62)
- Autonetics D-17B
- Royal Radar Establishment Automatic Computer
- Telefunken TR4
- RW-400 aka AN/FSQ-27 by TRW
- SDS 910
- SDS 920
- Odra 1002
- Ferranti Argus – first delivery in 1962, renamed to Argus 200 in 1963
- Librascope L-2010

=== 1963 ===
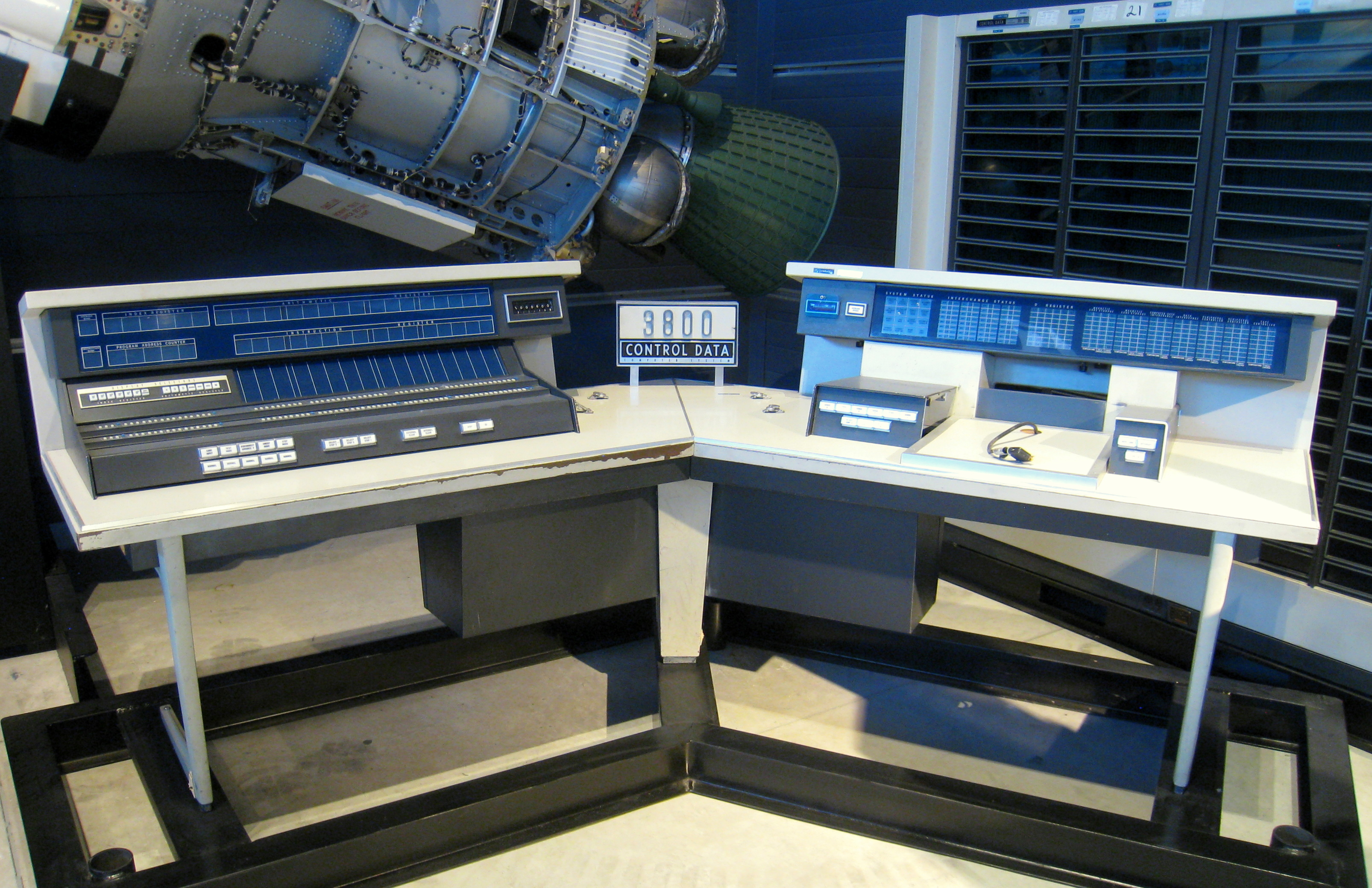
CDC 3800

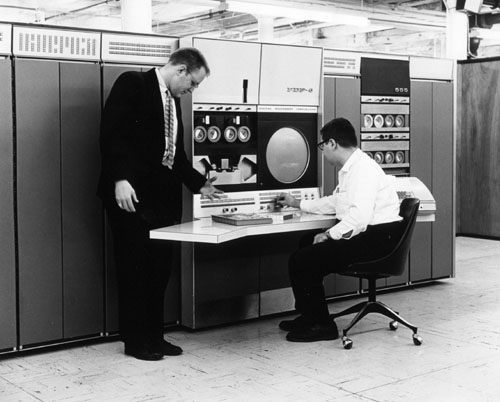
PDP-6

- Librascope LGP-21
- IBM 1440
- IBM 7010
- IBM 7040 and IBM 7044
- CDC 3000 series, 5 models (1963-1967)
- DEC PDP-5
- Elliott 503
- Ferranti-Packard 6000
- Ferranti Argus 100
- Honeywell 1400 (12/63)
- Honeywell 1800 (11/63)
- Computer Control Company DDP-24 (6/63)
- RCA 601
- UNIVAC 418
- UNIVAC 1050 III*UNIVAC 1050 III (9/63)
- SDS 9300
- BESM 3M, 4 circa 1963
- Siemens 3003
- IBM Saturn Launch Vehicle Computer (hybrid, August 1963)

=== 1964 ===
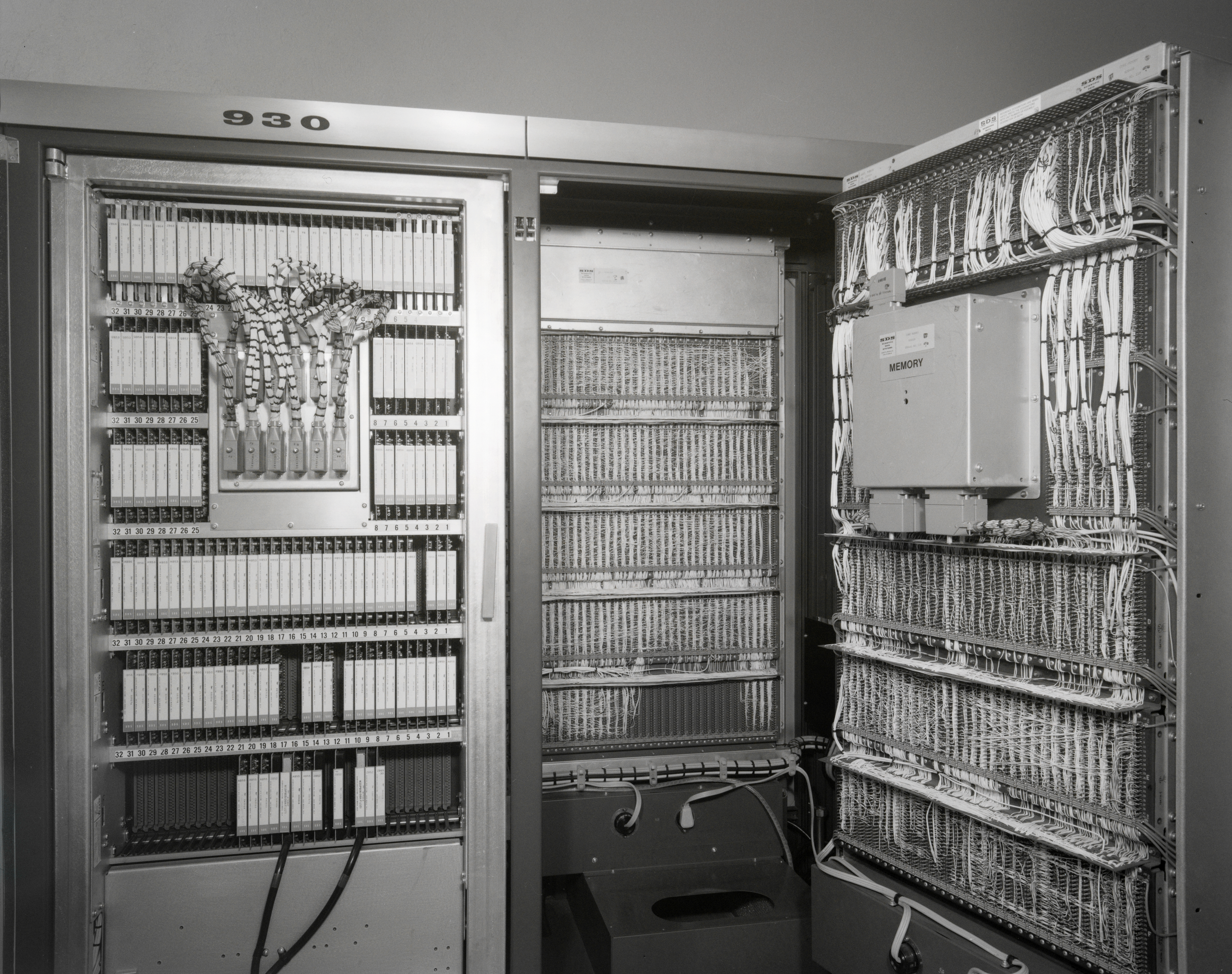
SDS 930

- Burroughs B5500
- CDC 1604B
- DEC PDP-7
- DEC PDP-8
- IBM 7094 II (4/64)
- GE 235 (4/64)
- GE-400 series
- GE 415 (5/64)
- GE 425 (6/64)
- English Electric KDF8
- English Electric KDF9
- Honeywell 200/200 (7/64)
- Honeywell 200/2200 (12/65)
- RCA 3301 (7/64)
- SDS 925
- SDS 930
- UNIVAC 1004 II, III (6/64)
- CDC 160G (4/64)
- CDC 6600
- Titan (1963 computer) (Atlas 2)
- Bunker-Ramo BR-133 aka AN/UYK-3
- UMC-10
- PDP-6

=== 1965 ===
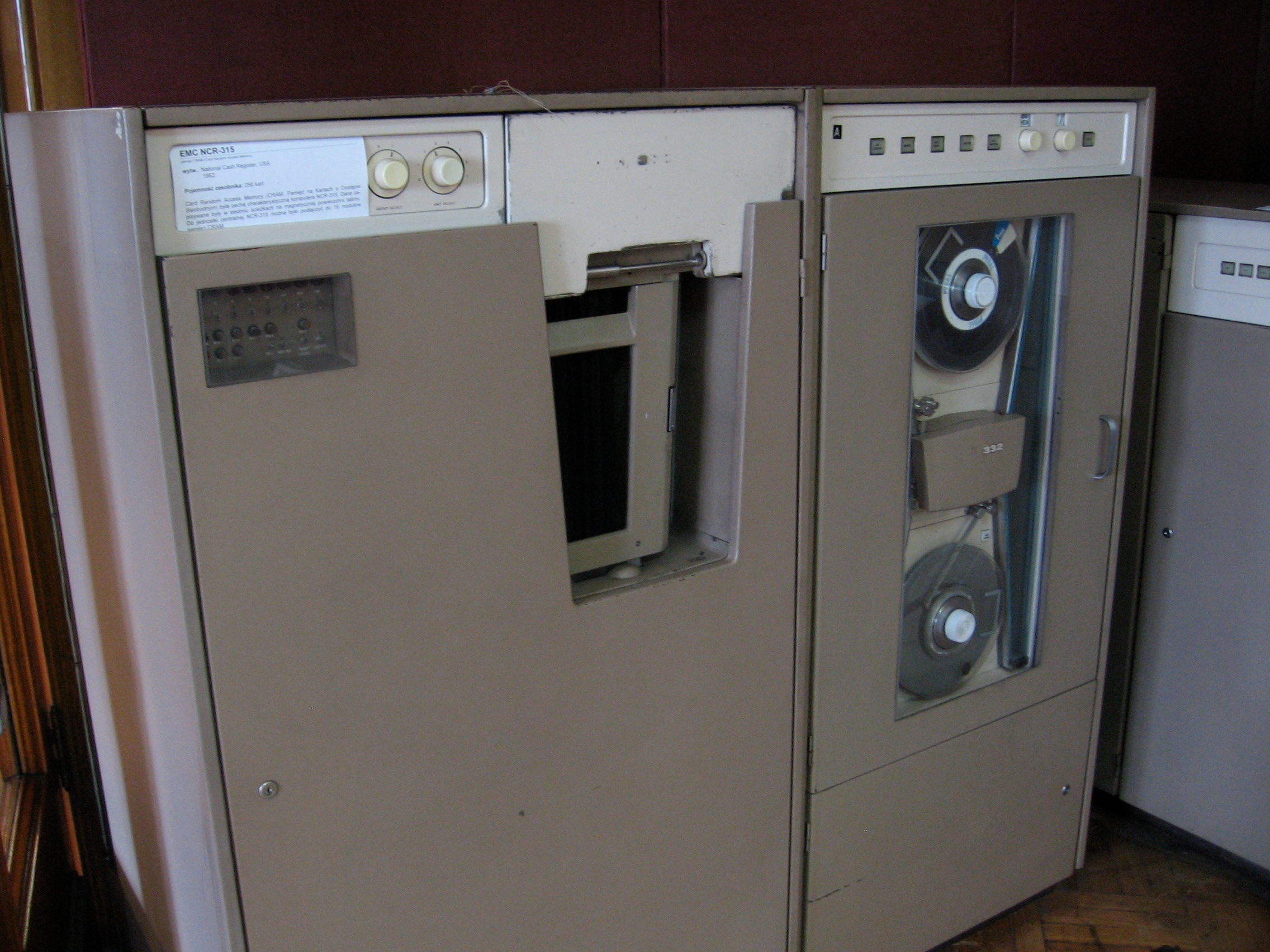
NCR 315

- ICT 1900 series
- CDC 1604-C
- GE 435 (9/65)
- GE-600 series (some integrated circuits)
- NCR 315-RMC
- PDP-8 & 8S (1965 & 1966)
- IBM System/360 family, 14 models (1965-1971). Used IBM SLT hybrid circuits.
- IBM 1130 IBM's least-expensive computer at that time, also used hybrid circuits (IBM SLT)
- IBM M44/44X
- SDS 940
- TRASK, transistor version of BESK
- Model 109-B
- Ural computer family, 3 models (1965-1969)
- Fabri-Tek BI-TRAN SIX Computer Educational System
- Computer Control DDP-116 & 124
- Marconi Myriad I, Ferranti Minicor I hybrid diode–transistor logic
- UNIVAC 1108 II (9/65)

=== 1966 ===
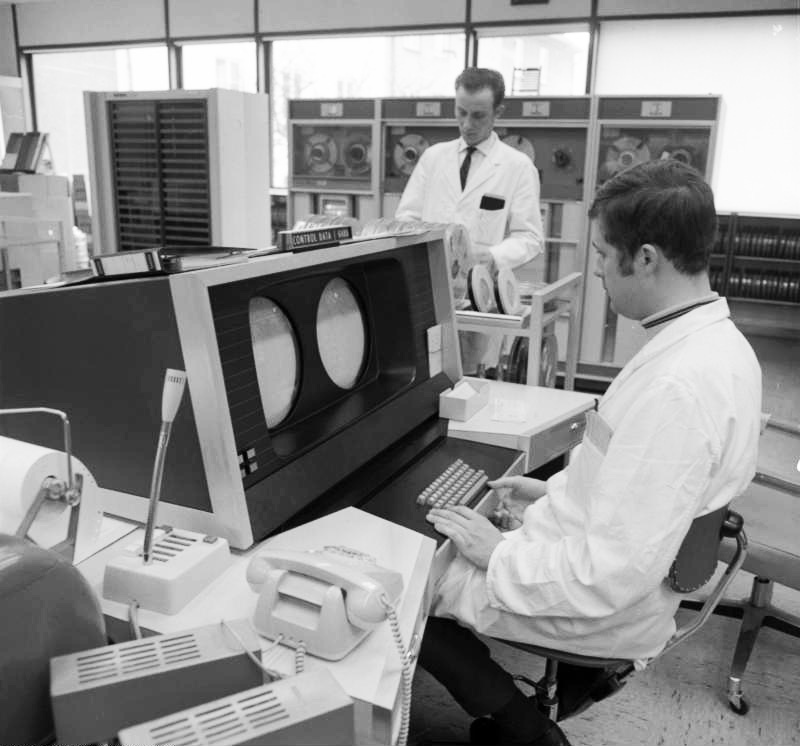
CDC 6400

- CDC 6400 (June 1966)
- DEC PDP-8/S
- DEC PDP-9
- GE 115 (4/66)
- Honeywell 200/120 (2/66)
- Honeywell 200/1200 (1/66)
- Honeywell 200/4200 (12/66)
- IBM 1800
- SDS 940
- SDS Sigma 2
- UNIVAC 494
- UNIVAC 1005 I, II, III (2/66)

=== 1967 ===
- CER-22
- D4a built in 1963 by Joachim Lehmann at the TU Dresden in about 10 exemplars. (Note: Used for training and research purposes.) After modifications produced from 1967 as Cellatron 8201. (Note: Revised in 1969 as Cellatron 8205.)
- Honeywell 200/8200

=== 1968 ===
- PDP-10 (first model only – later versions used ICs)
- SDS 945
- BESM-6 (first model only – later versions used ICs)
- Moscow Power Engineering Institute M-54
- Digico Micro 16

=== 1969 ===
- CDC 6700
- CDC 7600
- GE 105
- GE-615
- UNIVAC 1106
- Univac 400
- PDP-12

== See also ==
- Transistor count § Transistor computers
- List of relay computers – Electromechanical computers
- List of vacuum-tube computers – First generation programmable computers
