= GXS Inc. =

American IT services company

OpenText GXS
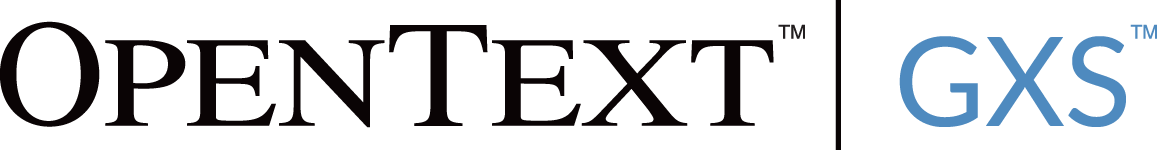
- Type: Subsidiary
- Industry: B2B e-Commerce; Data integration Cloud Services Brokerage
- Founded: 1967; 59 years ago 2000 (as GXS Inc.)
- Headquarters: Gaithersburg, Maryland, U.S.
- Products: Managed services, professional services, B2B integration
- Revenue: ▲US$ 480 million (2011)
- Number of employees: ~3,000
- Parent: OpenText
- Website: www.gxs.com

GXS (OpenText GXS) is a subsidiary of OpenText Corporation headquartered in Gaithersburg, Maryland, United States. Its GXS Trading Grid managed more than twelve billion transactions in 2011. Since 2004, GXS has invested more than $250 million in GXS Trading Grid. As of March 16, 2012, more than 550,000 businesses connect to GXS Trading Grid and, on average, more than 2,000 new businesses join each month.

As of December 31, 2011, 58.5% of GXS revenues come from the U.S. and 41.5% of GXS revenues are earned outside the United States and are managed by regional headquarters in Hong Kong, London, São Paulo and Tokyo.

On November 5, 2013, OpenText Corporation in Waterloo, Canada, announced their acquisition of GXS.

== History ==
=== Mark III ===
The roots of GXS go back to the Dartmouth Time-Sharing System, started in 1962, eventually a joint project between Dartmouth College and General Electric under the oversight of Donald Shell. See the history under the referenced articles. GE met with success in selling computer remote timesharing services provided via distributed centers, on the Mark I Time-Sharing System and formed the Information Processing Centers Business (IPCB) in 1966 renamed six months later as the Information Services Department (ISD). As the power of the mainframes increased, GE replaced the dedicated DATANET-30 (DN-30) communications computers with a multi-tier network composed of DN-30 and other computers forming a world-wide star network topology with redundant circuits and switchers. With the reimplementation of the time-sharing system on GE 635 computers at Dartmouth and the growing network, GE renamed the system the Mark II time sharing service. The computers were accessed in ASCII text-mode on 300 and 1,200 bps terminals. They offered pre-written business, mathematics and engineering applications in libraries (as well as a few games) which could be run by any subscriber as well as a platform for software development in BASIC, Algol and Fortran IV.

Meanwhile, GE, under president Fred J. Borch, decided to exit the computer manufacturing business in 1970, but held on to the time sharing operations portion, which in 1969 had become a GE division, the Information Services Business Division (ISBD). Honeywell also retained non-U.S. distribution rights to the ISBD services. By 1973, the distributed mainframe computer centers had been consolidated into one in Brook Park, Ohio, near Cleveland. Honeywell 6000-series mainframes replaced the older GE 635 systems as did subsequent generations in later years. GE always adopted the largest and fastest in the Honeywell 6000 family.

GE ISBD created a custom connection between Mark II and the original batch operating system for the GE systems, the General Comprehensive Operating System (GCOS). Dubbed the "Foreground/Background Interface (FBI)", it allowed Mark II users to create batch jobs and "submit" them to be sent automatically to a system running GCOS, run there when convenient and the output returned to the Mark II user for review.

This combined system, with the introduction of the "FBI" was then called Mark III in 1972.

Another proprietary GE innovation in 1975 was to run the mainframes in single-processor "clusters", enabled by a specialized and custom hardware box (the "Scratch Pad" (SPAD)) that connected the systems. This allowed up to six fully separate mainframes to coordinate their access to the Mark II file systems. All file system updates were first coordinated on the SPAD before any mainframe wrote updates to the disk file system. This allowed users to be distributed across multiple mainframes, access the same files and if a mainframe should crash, users could login again instantly to another computer in the cluster. This created availability numbers often above 99.99%.

As the GE network grew, the Mark III mainframes were eventually located in three processing centers called Supercenters. The center in Brook Park, Ohio, was supplemented by first one in Rockville, Maryland (1974) and in (1977) Amstelveen, The Netherlands. All were completely networked and equally accessible from anywhere in the world, allowing GE to move load from one center to another and transmit off-site backups for disaster recovery purposes.

In 1979 the distribution agreement with Honeywell led to the formation of a joint-venture company called GE Information Services Company, or GEISCO. Three years later, GEISCO became a wholly owned GE subsidiary with the buy-out of Honeywell's interest in the venture. Without the need for a separate legal entity for shared-ownership, eventually GEISCO quietly became just General Electric Information Services (GEIS).

As GEIS, the service was expanded with Fortran 77 and C programming languages (1985), but was hard hit by the availability of Personal Computers supplanting much of the isolated computational loads previously accomplished on time sharing. GEIS refocused on "Network-Based Services" where the world-wide availability of homogenous access to a customer's applications and data could be leveraged to advantage. Services like sales-force reporting, international banking and transfers, customer support and eventually e-mailall required a highly reliable worldwide network.

GEIS also tried to adapt its pricing model. Since the outset, GEIS services were always priced as a combination of proprietary Computer Resource Units (CRU), Terminal Connect Hours (TCH) and Kilo-Characters (KC). The CRU was a highly proprietary formula which took in variables such as the CPU time, memory size and file system input-output operations performed in a program run. It was carefully adjusted whenever new hardware (or sometimes operating system software) was deployed so that test programs generated the same CRU numbers over many years, giving customers stability. TCH and KC meaning are, as expected, the time connected to the network and the number of characters sent in or out. The monetary pricing attached to these numbers could vary over time and from country to country. Responding to competition and customer values, GEIS introduced "transaction pricing" where the above "resource pricing" was suppressed and the applications could issue their own transaction counts that were then priced. This met with limited success.

=== GEnie ===
In October 1985, GEIS introduced GEnie, an online community similar to CompuServe. Initially, for the first years into the '90s GEnie was extremely successful. It became a major group within GEIS and a force in the online community, particularly gaming. However, it was always saddled with its initial business justification: a means to generate extra revenue from unused computer and network capacity outside the mainstream business use load times. This made the service appear largely costless from a computer and network resource accounting view, and was the basis of the ongoing refusal by management to lease additional mainframes to support the service when it became popular. This choked developments GEnie could have made but didn't, to avoid becoming even more "too successful."

With the rise of the Internet, GEIS' failure to provide email service until 1993, the extremely slow speed of the character-based Mark III network, the lack of an internet portal, and competition from ISPs, CompuServe, and AOL; GEnie ended on the last day of the millennium. Mark III service and GEIS itself soon followed.

=== GXS ===
In 2000, GEIS was rebranded GXS (Global Exchange Services). In June 2002, GXS was acquired by venture capital firm Francisco Partners from General Electric (GE). It then operated as an independent firm, although GE retains a minority share in its investments.

In 2011, GXS Trading Grid was named "SaaS Product of the Year" by Techworld.

On November 5, 2013, OpenText announced its intention to acquire GXS.

In January 2014, GXS was acquired by Canadian-based OpenText Corporation (NASDAQ: OTEX) (TSX: OTC) and adopted the name OpenText GXS.

=== Acquisitions and partnerships ===
In 2003, GXS acquired Celarix, a supply-chain optimization software and services vendor, and in 2004 GXS acquired HAHT Commerce.

In 2005, GXS acquired the EDI and Business Exchange Services assets of IBM Corporation.

In May 2006, Microsoft and GXS formed a partnership to integrate Microsoft technologies with the GXS Trading Grid. Microsoft endorsed the GXS Trading Grid as its recommended network for Microsoft BizTalk Server. GXS and Microsoft were awarded the first Power of Partnership Award in June 2006 by START-IT magazine.

Also in 2006, GXS acquired product data quality service provider, UDEX.

On June 4, 2007, Verizon announced that it will sell GXS Trading Grid services as Custom Supply Chain Managed Services and Invoice Automation Service.

In 2008, Accenture and GXS entered into a global partnership to support Accenture Supply Chain Services (ASCS) business. Through the agreement, Accenture offers GXS Trading Grid(r) services, such as Active Orders and Active Inventory Management to its manufacturing customer base.

On January 5, 2009, GXS announced its acquisition of Interchange, one of the leading e-commerce service providers in Brazil. GXS acquired Interchange from Banco Real, Citibank Brazil, EDS, an HP company, and Itaú Unibanco.

On June 3, 2010, GXS completes merger with Inovis, another business-to-business and e-commerce provider.

On March 29, 2011, GXS announced it had acquired RollStream - a Software as a Service (SaaS) company.

== Operations ==
GXS provides business-to-business integration and on-demand supply chain integration, synchronization and collaboration solutions over its cloud platform, GXS Trading Grid. In 2004 the company launched its GXS Trading Grid via a partnership with webMethods. The Trading Grid enables the real-time flow of information between businesses regardless of standards preferences, spoken language or geographic location.
