= Elliott 803 =

Small, medium-speed transistor digital computer manufactured in the 1960s

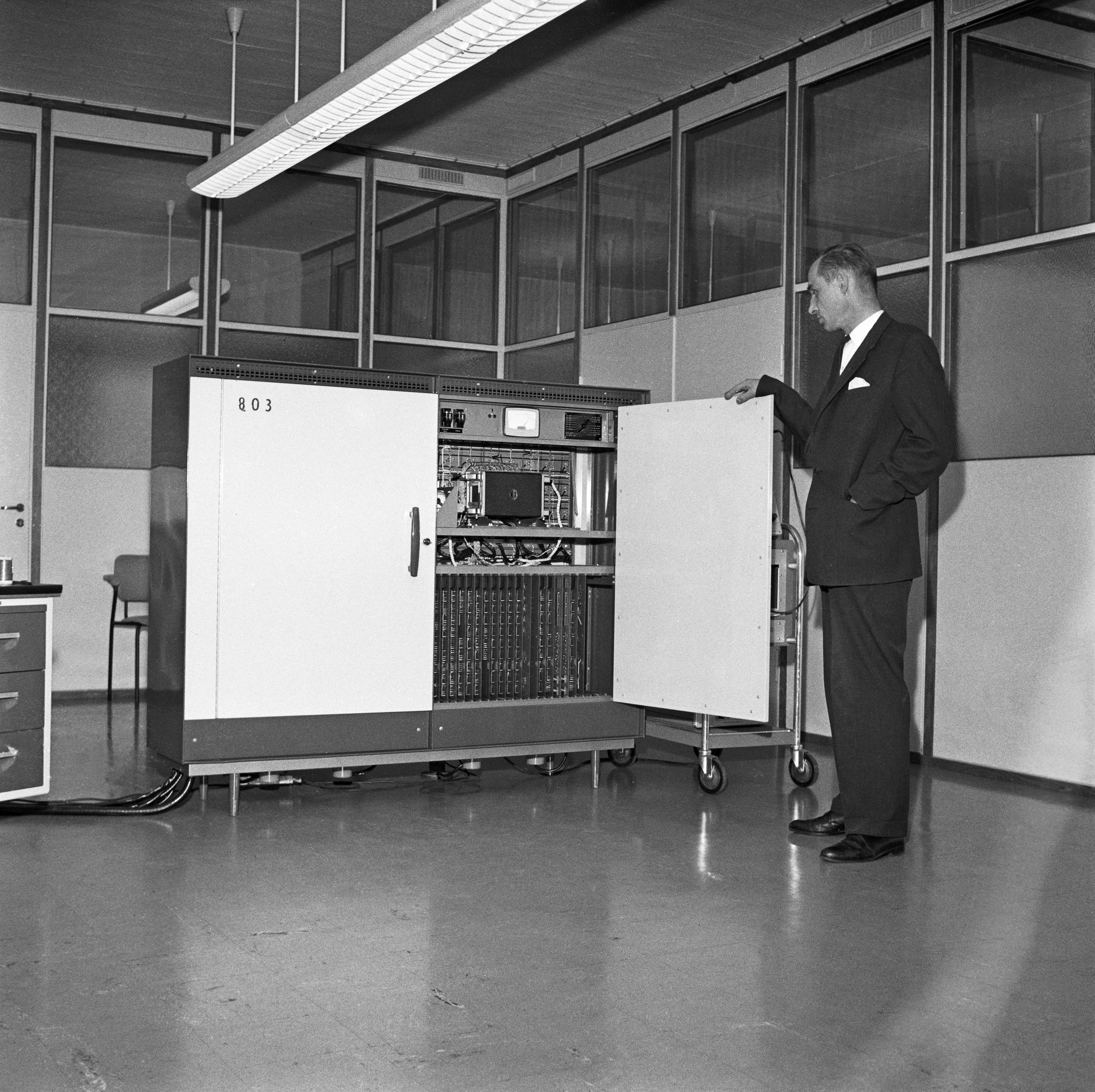
An Elliott 803A computer is being demonstrated in Helsinki, Finland, September 1960.

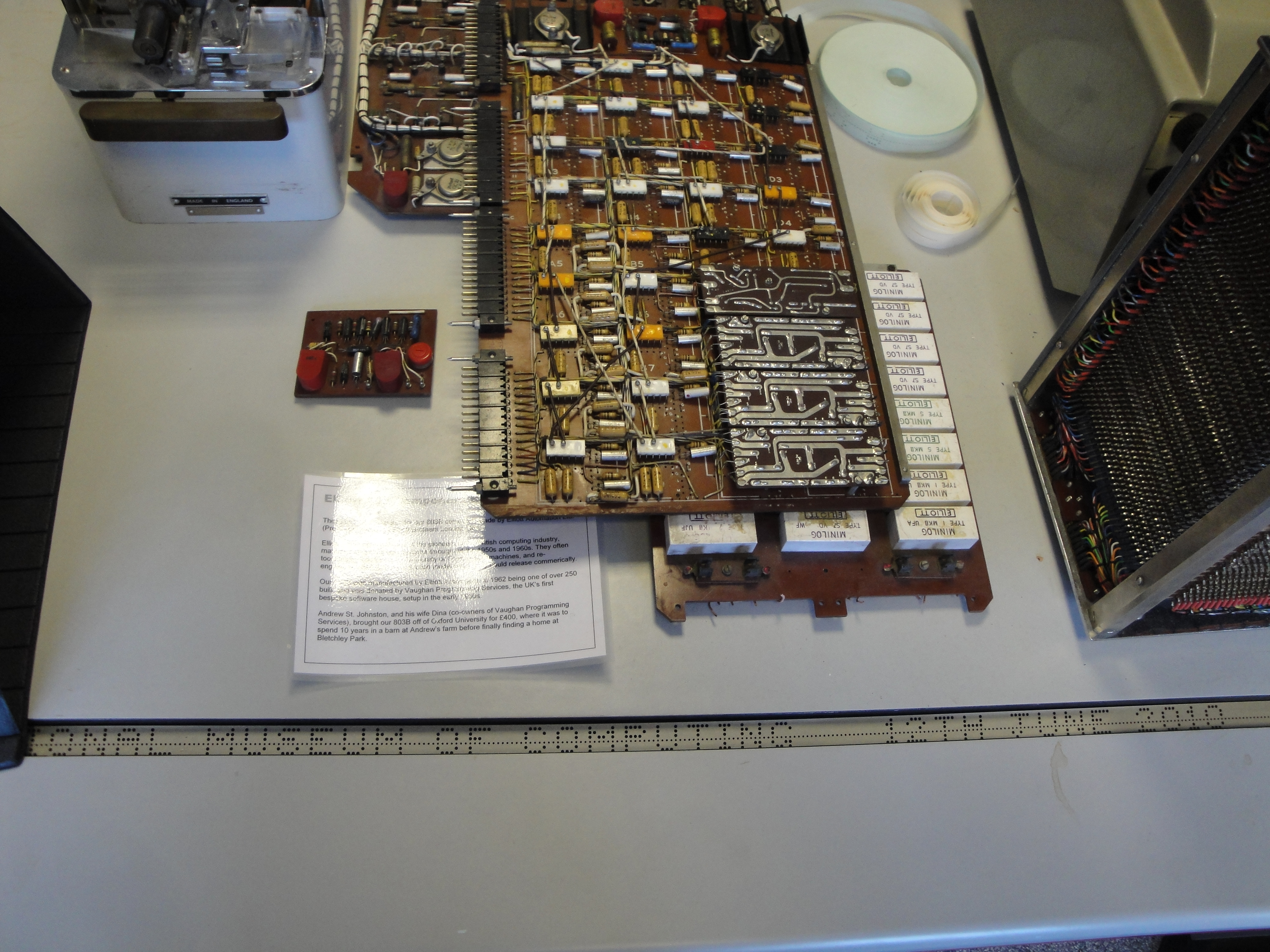
Parts from an Elliott 803B

The Elliott 803 is a small, medium-speed transistor digital computer which was manufactured by the British company Elliott Brothers in the 1960s. About 211 were built.

== History ==
The 800 series began with the 801, a one-off test machine built in 1957. The 802 was a production model but only seven were sold between 1958 and 1961. The short-lived 803A was built in 1959 and first delivered in 1960; the 803B was built in 1960 and first delivered in 1961.

Over 200 Elliott 803 computers were delivered to customers, at a unit price of about £29,000 in 1960 (roughly equivalent to £581,000 in 2025). Most sales were of the 803B version with more parallel paths internally, larger memory and hardware floating-point operations.

One model was used to interface with a facsimile of the American Field Artillery Digital Automatic Computer FADAC for trials by the British Royal Artillery in the production of howitzer firing data. After successful trials the Army went on to commission the General Electric Company GEC to produce the Field Artillery Computer System Face for the Royal Artillery.

The Elliott 803 was the computer used in the ISI-609, the world's first process or industrial control system, wherein the 803 was a data logger. It was used for this purpose at the US's first dual-purpose nuclear reactor, the N-Reactor.

A significant number of British universities had an Elliott 803.

Elliott subsequently developed (1963) the much faster, software compatible, Elliott 503.

Two complete Elliott 803 computers survive. One is owned by the Science Museum in London but it is not on display to the public. The second is owned by The National Museum of Computing (TNMoC) at Bletchley Park, is fully functional, and can regularly be seen in operation by visitors to that museum.

== Hardware description ==
The 803 is a transistorised, bit-serial machine; the 803B has more parallel paths internally. It uses ferrite magnetic-core memory in 4096 or 8192 words of 40 bits, comprising 39 bits of data with parity. The central processing unit (CPU) is housed in one cabinet with a height, width, and depth, of 56 by 66 by 16 inches (142 by 168 by 41 cm). Circuitry is based on printed circuit boards with the circuits being rather simple and most of the signalling carried on wires. There is a second cabinet about half the size used for the power supply, which is unusually based on a large nickel–cadmium battery with charger, an early form of uninterruptible power supply. A third cabinet (the same size as the power cabinet) holds the extra working store on machines with 8192 word stores. There is an operator's control console, Creed teleprinter and high-speed paper punched tape reader and punch for input/output, using 5-track Elliott telecode code, not Baudot. Tape is read at 500 characters per second and punched at 100 cps. The operator's console, about 60 inches long, allows low-level instructions to be entered manually to manipulate addresses and data and can start, stop and step the machine: there is a loudspeaker (pulsed by the top bit of the instruction register) which allows the operator to judge the status of a computation. The system requires air conditioning, drawing about 3.5 kW of power in a minimal configuration. A minimal installation weighed about 1,800 pounds (820 kg).

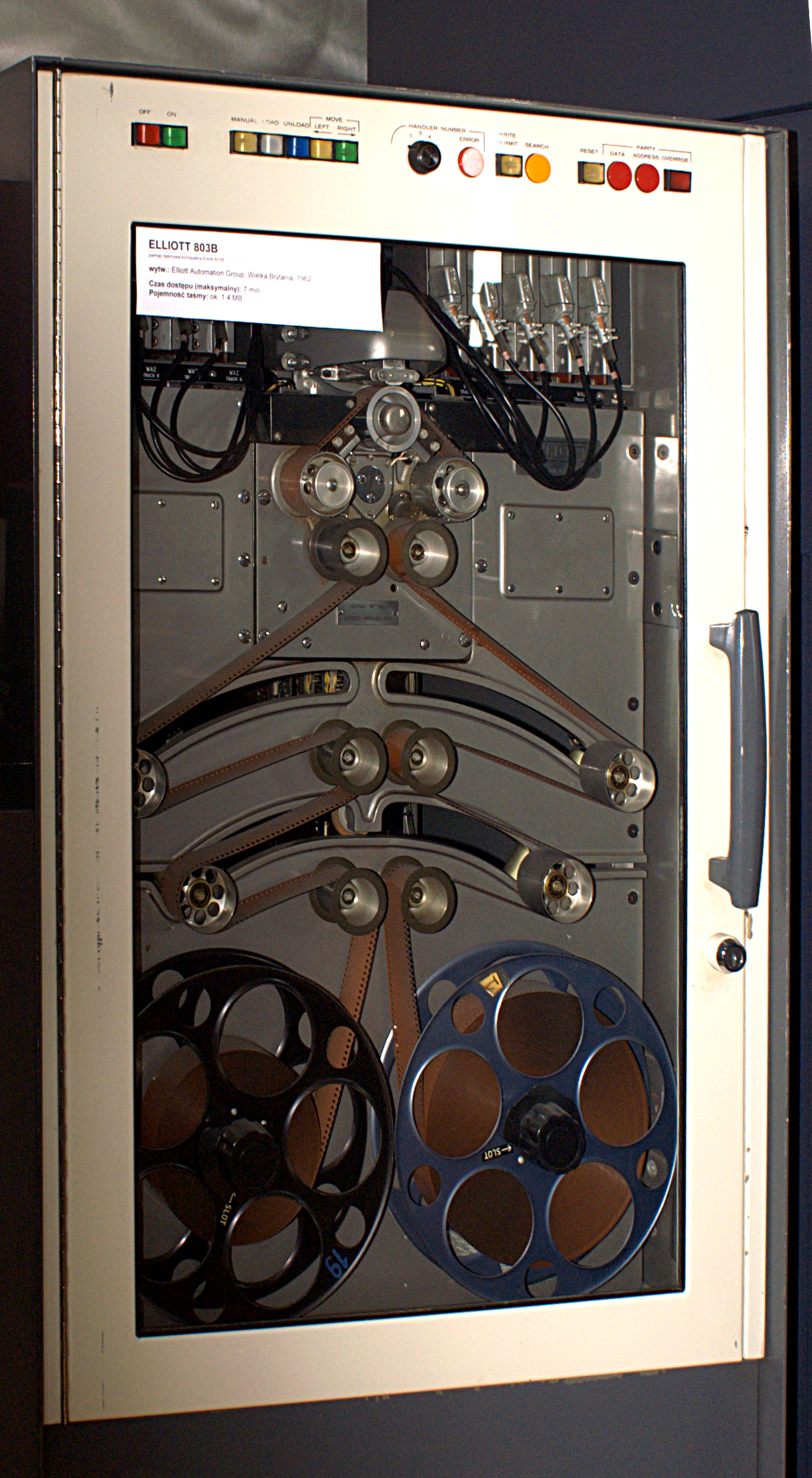
35 mm magnetic film handler

Optional mass storage is available on an unusual magnetic tape system based on standard 35 mm film stock coated with iron oxide (manufactured by Kodak). At the time this was in use by the film industry to record sound tracks. Elliott's factory at Borehamwood was close to the Elstree film studios which explains the use of the 35mm sprocketed media. The 1000-foot reels held 4096 blocks of 64 words per block (4096 x 64 x 39 = 10,223,616 bits, or the equivalent of about 1.3 megabytes).

Another unusual feature is the use of magnetic cores not only for memory but also as logic gates. These logic cores have 1, 2 or 3 input windings, a trigger (read) and an output winding. Depending on their polarity, current pulses in the input windings either magnetise the core or cancel each other out. The magnetised state of the core indicates the result of a boolean logic function. Two clock phases designated alpha and beta are used to trigger (reset to zero) alternate cores. A change from a one to a zero produces a pulse on the output winding. Cores which receive alpha trigger pulses (alpha cores) have inputs fed from gates which are triggered on the beta phase (beta cores). Transistors were expensive at the time and each logic gate requires only one to amplify the output winding pulse; however a single transistor drives the inputs of a small number of (typically 3) other cores. If more than 3 inputs are to be driven, up to two more transistors can be driven by each core.

== Instruction set ==
Instructions and data are based on a 39-bit word length with binary representation in 2's complement arithmetic. The instruction set operates on a single address and single accumulator register, with an additional auxiliary register for double length integer multiply and divide. Although it is believed that the single length divide and square root instructions were only enabled in 803s destined for process control applications, the one remaining operational 803B has been found to have these instructions enabled, probably because it was used by a software house to develop real time and process control applications. An instruction is composed of a 6-bit function field (conventionally represented in octal) and a 13 bit address. This gives 64 instructions organised as 8 groups of 8 instructions. The 13-bit memory address field gives an addressable range of 8192 words. These 19-bit instructions are packed two to a word with an additional 39th bit between them, the so-called B-line or B digit (the term is a legacy from the Ferranti Mark 1 computer, where the A-line represented the accumulator and the B-line an instruction modifier, both stored on a Williams tube). Setting the B digit has the effect of adding the contents of the memory address of the first instruction to the second instruction at execution time, enabling indexing, indirect addressing, and other run-time instruction modifications. The bit time is 6 microseconds, jumps execute in 288 microseconds and simple arithmetic instructions in 576 microseconds. Floating-point operations take several milliseconds. IO is direct. Interrupts were not used by standard peripherals or documented in the programming guide.

In the following descriptions, A and N represent the accumulator and the literal address, a and n represent the (initial) contents of the accumulator and addressed store location, and a' and n' the resultant contents.

=== Instruction Groups 0 – 3 ===
These are fixed point arithmetic with 4 different combinations of operand and result destination:

Groups 0 – 3

Fn	Operation	a'	n'

Fn	Operation	a'	n'

00	Do nothing	a	n
01	Negate	-a	n
02	Replace & count	n + 1	n
03	Collate	a & n	n
04	Add	a + n	n
05	Subtract	a - n	n
06	Clear	zero	n
07	Negate & add	n - a	n

10	Exchange	n	a
11	Exchange and negate	-n	a
12	Exchange and count	n + 1	a
13	Write and collate	a & n	a
14	Write and add	a + n	a
15	Write and subtract	a - n	a
16	Write and clear	zero	a
17	Write, negate and add	n - a	a

20	Write	a	a
21	Write negatively	a	-a
22	Count in store	a	n + 1
23	Collate in store	a	a & n
24	Add into store	a	a + n
25	Negate store and add	a	a - n
26	Clear store	a	zero
27	Subtract from store	a	n - a

30	Replace	n	n
31	Replace and negate store	n	-n
32	Replace and count in store	n	n + 1
33	Replace and collate in store	n	a & n
34	Replace and add to store	n	a + n
35	Replace, negate store and add	n	a - n
36	Replace and clear store	n	zero
37	Replace and subtract from store	n	n - a

=== Instruction Group 4 ===
Group 4 is conditional and unconditional jumps. Functions 40 – 43 jump to the first instruction of a pair, and 44 – 47 to the second.

Group 4

Fn	Operation

40	Transfer to 1st instruction unconditionally
41	Transfer to 1st instruction if a is negative
42	Transfer to 1st instruction if a is zero
43	Transfer to 1st instruction if overflow set, and clear it
44	Transfer to 2nd instruction unconditionally
45	Transfer to 2nd instruction if a is negative
46	Transfer to 2nd instruction if a is zero
47	Transfer to 2nd instruction if overflow set, and clear it

=== Instruction Group 5 ===
Group 5 is multiply, divide and shift instructions. Some of these use the 38-bit Auxiliary Register (AR – contents denoted by ar), which can be thought of as an extension of the accumulator at the least significant end. Multiplications and divisions regard a/ar as a signed fraction between -1 and one least significant bit less than +1. Despite the 803 Handbook saying "All odd functions in Group 5 clear the AR", function 57 does not clear it.

Group 5

Fn	Operation

50	Arithmetic right shift a/ar N times
51	Logical right shift a N times, clear ar
52	Multiply a by n, result to a/ar
53	Multiply a by n, single length rounded result to a, clear ar
54	Arithmetic left shift a/ar N times
55	Logical left shift a N times, clear ar
56	Divide a/ar by n, single length quotient to a, clear ar
57	Copy ar to a, set sign bit zero, do NOT clear the ar

=== Instruction Group 6 ===
Group 6 is floating-point instructions (if a floating-point unit is installed).

Floating-point numbers are represented in a 39-bit word or in the accumulator as (from most to least significant end):

- a 30 bit 2's complement signed mantissa a in the range ½ ≤ a < 1 or -1 ≤ a < -½
- a 9 bit signed exponent b represented as a positive integer 0 ≤ (b+256) ≤ 511.

Zero is always represented by all 39 bits zero.

Note that the test for zero and test for negative jump instructions are equally valid for floating-point.

Group 6

Fn	Operation	a'	n'

60	Add n to a	a + n	n
61	Subtract n from a	a - n	n
62	Negate a and add n	n - a	n
63	Multiply a by n	a * n	n
64	Divide a by n	a / n	n
65	N = 4096: Convert fixed point integer in the accumulator to floating-point
65	N < 4096: Fast left (end round) shift N mod 64 places
66	(Spare)
67	(Spare)

All these instructions clear the auxiliary register.

=== Instruction Group 7 ===
Group 7 is input/output, with the exception of 73, which is used for subroutine linkage. There is a much more complete description of the Group 7 functions in the "Our Computer Heritage" link.

Group 7

Fn	Operation

70	Read the keyboard number generator to the accumulator
71	Read one character from the tape reader and logically "or" it into the least significant 5 bits of the accumulator
72	Output to optional peripheral device such as the digital plotter:
73	Write the address of this instruction to location N
74	Send a character represented by N to the punch
75	Channel 2 function
76	Channel 2 function
77	Channel 2 function

Digital Plotter Control:

Instruction	Pen motion
72 7168	No motion
72 7169	EAST
72 7170	WEST
72 7172	NORTH
72 7176	SOUTH
72 7173	NORTH EAST
72 7174	NORTH WEST
72 7177	SOUTH EAST
72 7178	SOUTH WEST
72 7184	Pen Up
72 7200	Pen Down

Entry to a subroutine at address N is normally effected by the sequence:

73 LINK : 40 N

The return address has been stored in a link location (typically the location before the start of the subroutine (e.g. N-1) )

and returns by using the sequence:

00 LINK / 40 1

=== Example program ===
By way of an example, the following is the Initial Instructions, hard-wired into locations 0 – 3, and used for loading binary code from paper tape into memory. In accordance with the 803 convention, it is written with two instructions on each line, representing the contents of one word. The colon or slash between them represent a B digit value of zero or one respectively.

 0:  26 4 : 06 0    Clear loc'n 4; Clear A
 1:  22 4 / 16 3    Increment loc 4; Store A in loc'n (3 + content of loc'n 4) & clear A
 2:  55 5 : 71 0    Left shift A 5 times; Read tape and "or" into A
 3:  43 1 : 40 2    Jump to loc'n 1 if arith overflow; Jump to loc'n 2

There are several points to note in this very simple program:

- There is no count. The inner loop (locations 2 and 3) packs 5-bit characters into the accumulator until overflow occurs. Thus a 39 bit word is formed of eight 5 bit characters. The most significant bit of the first character is discarded but must be a 1 (unless the next bit is a 1), in order to provoke arithmetic overflow (a change of the sign bit).
- The first word read is stored into location 4, and this is then used as the address into which subsequent words are stored.
- Blank leading and trailing tape is ignored since zeroes can be shifted left indefinitely without causing overflow.
- There is no provision to terminate the outer loop (inner loop plus location 1). The tape can be stopped manually, or allowed to run out through the reader (since the blank trailer is ignored). More usually, Initial Instructions are used to read a more sophisticated secondary bootstrap (T23) into the top of store. After writing to the last store location (8191) the address is allowed to wrap round to 0. Writing zero to locations 0 – 3 has no effect (since the contents of these locations are created by logic gates rather than being read from the core store), and a special value is then written to location 4. This value has 22 in the function code bits and the secondary bootstrap entry point minus 3 in the address bits. This means that the B digit has the effect of transforming the 16 (store) instruction in location 1 into a 40 (jump) instruction (16 + 22 = 40 in octal), and of adding 3 to the address bits. The net result is a jump to the entry point of the secondary bootstrap!

(The data values for the wrapped-around locations 0 – 3 must be zero since counter values 8192, 8193 etc. change the B-modified second half of location 1 from a 16 to a 17 instruction, which sets a to n - a instead of clearing it, as required by the inner loop.)

=== Interrupts ===
The 803 has a little-known interrupt facility. Whilst it is not mentioned in the programming guide and is not used by any of the standard peripherals, the operation of the interrupt logic is described in the 803 hardware handbooks and the logic is shown in the 803 maintenance diagrams (Diagram 1:LB7 Gb). Interrupts are probably used mostly in conjunction with custom interfaces provided as part of ARCH real time process control systems. Since all input and output instructions causes the 803 to become "busy" if input data is not available or if an output device has not completed a previous operation, interrupts are not needed and are not used for driving the standard peripherals.

Raising the interrupt input to the computer causes a break in execution as follows: as soon as the machine is in a suitable state (in particular, when not "busy" and only in certain states of the fetch/execute cycle), the next instruction pair is fetched from store location 5, without changing the Sequence Control Register (SCR). Location 5 is expected to contain a standard subroutine entry instruction pair (73 LINK : 40 N – see above), allowing the pre-interrupt execution address (still in the SCR) to be saved for later return. The external equipment raising the interrupt is relied upon to refrain from raising another interrupt until the first has been acknowledged by some suitable input/output instruction, so as to prevent interrupts from being nested. The Algol compiler does not regard location 5 as a reserved location, although this may have more to do with the unsuitability of Algol for process control applications than indicating that interrupts are never regarded as a mainstream facility.

== Compilers ==
The Initial Instructions described as the Example Program above is effectively a primary bootloader which is normally used to read a secondary bootloader known as T23, prepended to all program tapes. T23 allows more flexible program loading facilities including sum-checking of the loaded code.

Machine code programs are written in an octal/decimal representation exemplified in the Example Program above, and loaded by a rudimentary assembler known as the Translation Input Routine. It has no symbolic addressing facilities, but instead allows the source to be broken into blocks which can be manually relocated to allow for the expansion or contraction of a previous block in development. There is also an Autocode for simple programming tasks, allowing faster program development without the need for a knowledge of machine code. This has no formula translation facilities and requires all calculations to be reduced to a series of assignments with no more than a single operator on the right hand side.

The 803B with 8192 words of memory is capable of running the Elliott ALGOL compiler, a major subset of the Algol60 language, capable of loading and running several ALGOL programs in succession. This was largely written by Tony Hoare, employed by Elliotts as a programmer in August 1960. Hoare recounts some of his experiences at Elliotts in his 1980 Association for Computing Machinery (ACM) Turing Award lecture.

The 803B at The National Museum of Computing is now working well enough to run this compiler again. There is a short video on YouTube of it compiling and running a simple program.

== NCR involvement ==
The 803 was branded as the NCR-Elliott 803 when sold by NCR for commercial use. At this time, Elliott Automation were also making/assembling NCR 315's at Borehamwood.

=== Do-it-yourself computing ===
Elliott 803s (and later Elliott 4100s) were used in NCR-Elliott's joint venture "Computer Workshop" computer bureau. The unique feature of this bureau was that they ran 3-day courses to teach their customers to write their own programmes, and these were often donated to a library of programmes that could be used. Customers would come to Borehamwood (and later Greenford) to operate the computers themselves – an early example of personal computing. Prices per hour were £8 (equivalent to £160 in 2025) from 9 am to 5 pm, £6 (equivalent to £120 in 2025) from 5 pm to midnight, and £4 (equivalent to £80 in 2025) from midnight to 9 am.

The most popular applications were in civil engineering and architecture, for structural analysis, cut and fill, survey correction, and bills of quantities.

== Applications ==
The following were among 803 users:

- RMIT University in Melbourne, Australia utilised an Elliott 803 Computer for student use in 1966.
- Brush Electrical Machines in Loughborough, UK used an 803 for design calculation on power transformers and motors.
- G.P.O. used an 803 at their Dollis Hill Research Labs for electronics design and telephone network simulations.
- G.P.O. used an 803 at their Goonhilly Downs satellite earth station for calculating satellite passes and punching tapes to steer dishes.
- Corah Knitware in Leicester UK used a pair of 803s for telephone order processing and production planning.
- Thornber Farms in West Yorkshire UK used an 803 to process egg production data for breeding of chickens.
- The UK Potato Marketing Board used (circa 1964) an 803 to produce statistics and reports, from the records and accounts it held for 65,000 registered growers
- Vickers, da Costa, a London stockbroker, used an 803B for trade processing and payroll from 1961 to 1966 when it was replaced with a National Elliot 4300.
- The RAF No. 1 Radio School at RAF Locking used an 803 in 1968 to train the first RAF Computer Technician Apprentices.
- The Medical Research Council Biophysics Research Unit at King's College London in Drury Lane used an 803 for detailed calculations to verify the structure of DNA and in early attempts to sequence RNA.
- United Steel's (later British Steel) Swinden House Laboratories in Rotherham took delivery of an 803 in 1963. It was used, in part, for simulating various processes in steel manufacture.
- Battersea College of Advanced Technology used an 803 for student training.
- Mullard Research Laboratories in Redhill used an 803.
- Banco Pinto de Magalhães (pt), a Portuguese bank, took delivery of an 803-B, the first computer to be installed in Portugal, around late-1961. It was used, in part, to register and keep track of current accounts.
- The National Gas Turbine Establishment, Pyestock Farnborough used an 803B delivered in 1962 for performance and design calculations on aircraft and processing aerodynamic data.
- Brown Brothers Ltd in Swindon, a motor trade distributor, installed an Elliott 803B in their headquarters building on the Dorcan Estate for use in stock control. This was later donated to Swindon Technical College.
- Elliott Automation had a facility at Rochester Airport, Kent, where they ran an 803.
- The London Hospital, in Whitechapel, London, England, installed an 803 c1964, which was the first computer to be used in a British hospital.

A number of computers was delivered to foreign countries, i.e.:

- 1959 E.I. Du Pont de Nemours Inc., Beaumont, Texas, USA
- 1960 Northern Illinois Gas Corporation, Bellwood, USA
- 1961 Banco Pinto de Magalhais in Oporto, Portugal
- 1961 Technical University of Helsinki in Finland
- 1961 Hindustan Aircraft Ltd. in India
- 1961 Electrotechnical lnstitute in Warsaw, Poland
- 1961 Koch & Mazzuckin in Hannover, Federal German Republic
- 1962 Phenix Belge Insurance Co., Antwerp in Belgium
- 1962 Energoticky Dispecink in Czechoslovakia
- 1962 Ministry of Heavy Industry in Hungary
- 1962 University of Wroclaw in Poland
- 1963 Sovnarhozes, Moscow in U.S.S.R.
- 1963 CSIRO Chem. Research Labs. in Australia
- 1963 Monsanto Research S.A, Zurich in Switzerland
- 1964 Metalurski Institute in Yugoslavia
- 1964 Optische Industrie in the Netherlands
- 1966 Tampere University in Finland.

A number of second-hand 803s found their way into schools in the UK.

- Banbury School had 2 Elliott 803Bs, one with 4096 memory and tape, and one with the 8192 memory. They were used to teach Elliott Autocode as a primary language but also had an ALGOL compiler. They were also used for CESIL coding (Computer Education in Schools Instructional Language). The machines last ran in 1980 when they were replaced by a classroom of seven Apple 2e machines. The school also acquired the machine from Loughborough University for spares.
- Felsted School once had two Elliott 803's. Nowadays only the control console remains. It is hung up in the corner of one of the school's current IT rooms as a reminder to why the room is named "Elliott."
- Haydon School had two Elliot 803B's with 8192 words of core until the early-1980s, one being used for spare parts. One of them came from the nearby Brunel University. Peripherals included two film handlers, two optical readers, two punches and a teleprinter for output, a hardware square-root unit and a drum plotter. It was used for running Algol, Autoode and a BASIC and Fortran compilers were available. It was installed in the early 1970s under the care of the Physics Department. At the time it was still St Nicholas Grammar School for boys.
- Mill Hill School had an Elliott 803 with 8192 memory in the 1970s. It had five-track paper tape reader and printer but no other I/O devices. The school had Elliott 803 autocode and Algol compilers.
- Loughborough Grammar School was given the machine from Brush Electrical Machines mentioned above.
- Highbury Technical College had an Elliott 803B for student use in the early-1970s.
- Swindon Technical College (founded 1895, closed 2006) had an Elliott 803B in the early 1970s given by Brown Brothers Ltd (see above) and used by local schools including Commonweal Grammar School for teaching.
- Wanstead High School parents bought an Elliot 803B for the school from Oldacres Computers Ltd. It was installed in autumn 1973 and had 8192 memory, five-track paper tape punch and tape reader, and four film handlers.

== See also ==
- List of transistorized computers
