= GE 235 =

GE 235 may refer to:

- a model in the GE-200 series computers
- TransAsia Airways Flight 235
