= Gemini Challenger =

Motorola-68000-based computer, released in 1985

- Manufacturer: Gemini
- Type: Microcomputer
- Released: 1985; 41 years ago
- Lifespan: 1987; 39 years ago
- Introductory price: £4,750
- Media: 5.25" 1.2 MB floppy disc
- Operating system: MBOS, Mirage, TDI P-system, CP/M
- CPU: Motorola 68000 @ 12 MHz
- Memory: 512 KB
- Storage: Hard disks (20 to 70 MB)
- Display: Composite BNC, RF RCA
- Graphics: 768 x 576 @ 16 to 16 million colours; 1024 x 1024 @ 64 colours with optional HD63484 based video card
- Connectivity: SCSI, Parallel, 2 x Serial RS232, 4 x 68K expansion slots

The Gemini Challenger was a Motorola 68000 based computer, released in 1985 and designed by Gemini Microcomputers based in Chesham. This was Gemini's first non Z80 computer and their last.

It was designed to look like an ordinary PC-compatible computer, with a Wyse WY-50 remote terminal for monitor. Four operating systems were available (MBOS, aimed for business and supporting multiuser; Mirage, another multiuser OS; TDI p-System, a version of UCSD p-System including Pascal; CP/M 68k), along with an advanced optional graphic card (based on the Hitachi HD63484) with a maximum resolution of 1024 x 1024 pixels and 16 million available colours.
