= CESIL =

Educational computer programming language

CESIL, or Computer Education in Schools Instructional Language, is a programming language designed to introduce pupils in British secondary schools to elementary computer programming. It is a simple language containing a total of fourteen instructions.

== Background ==
Computer Education in Schools (CES) was a project that commenced in 1968 under the stewardship of the John Hoskyns Group. CESIL was developed by Hoskyns as part of the CES project, and introduced in April 1969. The project was taken over by International Computers Limited (ICL) in September 1969 to become ICL-CES. In those days, very few if any schools had computers, so pupils would write programs on coding sheets, which would then be transferred to punched cards or paper tape. Typically, this would be sent to run on a mainframe computer, with the output from a line printer being returned later.

== Structure ==
Because CESIL was not designed as an interactive language, there is no facility to input data in real time. Instead, numeric data is included as a separate section at the end of the program.

The fundamental principle of CESIL is the use of a single accumulator, which handles mathematical operations. Numeric values are stored in variables, which in CESIL are referred to as store locations. CESIL only works with integers, and results from DIVIDE operations are rounded if necessary. There is no facility for data structures such as arrays, nor for string handling, though string constants can be output by means of the PRINT instruction.

Jumps and loops can be conditional or non-conditional, and transfer operation of the program to a line with a specific label, which is identified in the first column of a coding sheet. The instruction or operation is stated in the second column, and the operand in the third column. On some coding sheets, comments and the text of the PRINT instruction would be written in a fourth column.

== Instructions ==
Instructions, or operations, are written in upper case and may have a single operand, which can be a store location, constant integer value or line label. Store locations and line labels are alphanumeric, up to six characters, and begin with a letter. Numeric integer constants must be signed + or −, with zero being denoted as +0. (Note: Visual CESIL does not require non-negative constants to be signed.)

=== Input and output ===
- IN – reads the next value from the data, and stores it in the accumulator. The error message *** PROGRAM REQUIRES MORE DATA *** is printed if the program tries to read beyond the end of the data provided.
- OUT – prints the current value of the accumulator. No carriage return is printed.
- PRINT "text in quotes" – prints the given text. No carriage return is printed.
- LINE – prints a carriage return, thus starting a new line.

=== Memory storage ===
- LOAD location or LOAD constant – copies the value of the given location or constant to the accumulator.
- STORE location – copies the contents of the accumulator to the given location.

=== Mathematical instructions ===
- ADD location or ADD constant – adds the value of the given location or constant to the accumulator.
- SUBTRACT location or SUBTRACT constant – subtracts the value of the given location or constant from the accumulator.
- MULTIPLY location or MULTIPLY constant – multiplies the accumulator by the value of the given location or constant.
- DIVIDE location or DIVIDE constant – divides the accumulator by the value of the given location or constant. The result is rounded down if the result is positive, and up if the result is negative. A *** DIVISION BY ZERO *** error message is printed if the divisor is zero.

In each case, the result of the operation is stored in the accumulator, replacing the previous value.

=== Program control ===
- JUMP label – unconditionally transfers control to location labelled.
- JINEG label (Jump If NEGative) – transfers control to location labelled if the accumulator contains a negative value.
- JIZERO label (Jump If ZERO) – transfers control to location labelled if the accumulator contains zero.
- HALT – terminates the program.

=== Other symbols ===
Three special symbols are used in CESIL at the beginnings of lines.

- % is used to mark the end of the program and the start of data.
- * is used to mark the end of the data.
- ( is used at the start of a line to indicate a comment. (Note: Not supported in Visual CESIL. * is used instead.)

== CESIL programming tools ==
An emulator for CESIL, designed to run on Windows and called Visual CESIL, is available as freeware.

An interpreter for CESIL, designed to run on the Android platform and called Wyrm CESIL, is available as free to install.

== Example ==
The following totals the integers in the runtime data section until it encounters a negative value and prints the total.

        LOAD    +0
LOOP    STORE   TOTAL
        IN
        JINEG   DONE
        ADD     TOTAL
        JUMP    LOOP

DONE    PRINT   "The total is: "
        LOAD    TOTAL
        OUT
        LINE
        HALT

%
1
2
3
-1
*

The output of the above program would be:

The total is: 6

== See also ==
- Computer literacy
- Computers in the classroom
- History of computer science
- HAGGIS - language invented to standardise marking of programming work in Scottish schools

== Bibliography ==
- Monson, Colin C; Sewell, Ian R; Frances P, Vickers (1978). Computer Studies. Vol. Book 1. ICL Computer Education in Schools. ISBN 0-903885-17-4.
