= Ferranti Perseus =

Vacuum tube computer

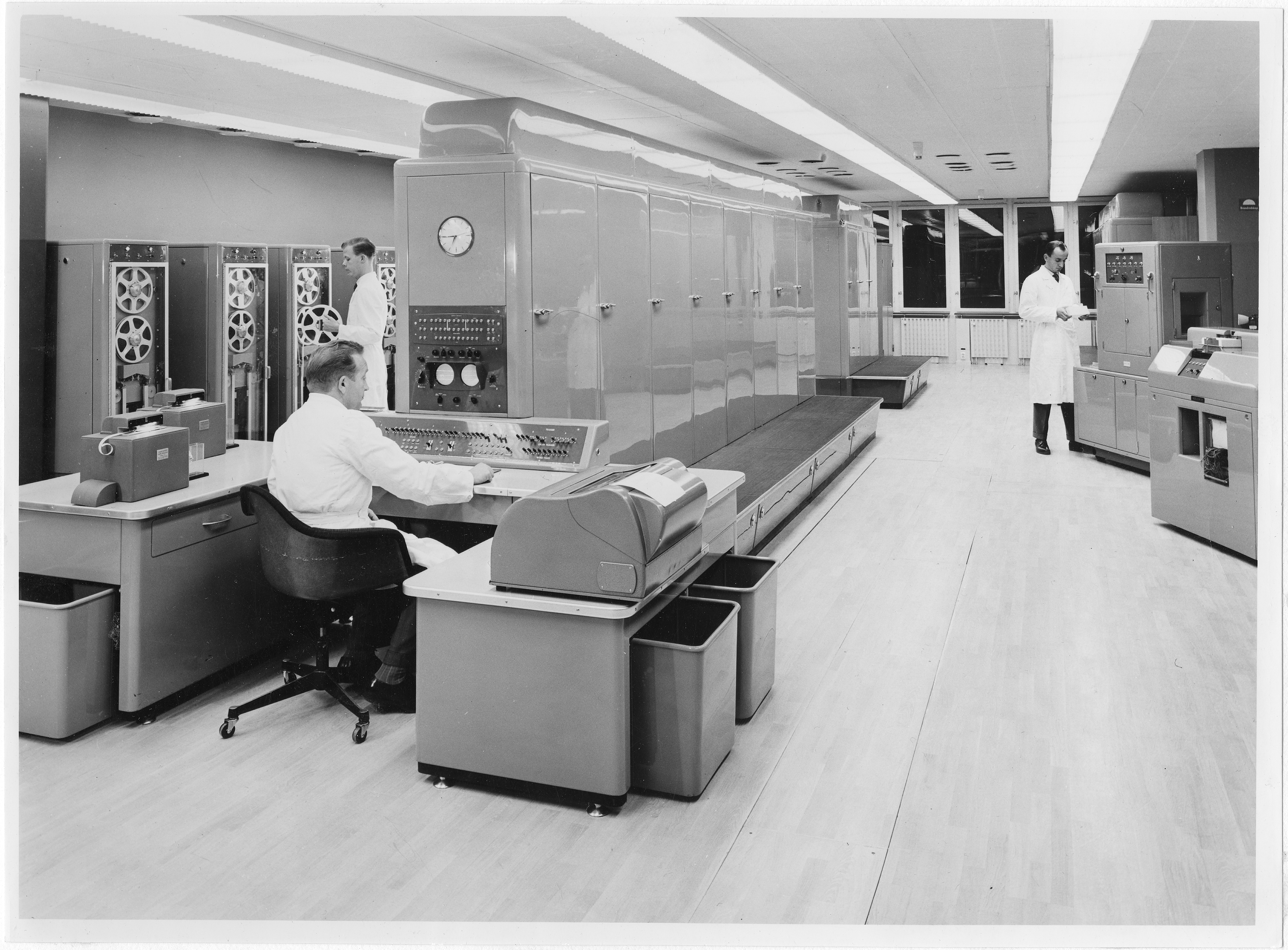
Ferranti Perseus

Perseus was a vacuum tube (valve) computer built by Ferranti Ltd of Great Britain. It was a development of the Ferranti Pegasus computer for large-scale data processing. Perseus, which was one of Ferranti's computer systems that included Orion and Sirius, was the company's first production machine marketed towards commercial users. The system used the automatic checking method. Two were sold, both to overseas insurance companies in 1959.

== Design ==
Perseus has two components that functioned independently of each other. The first was the central computer – the processing unit that handled data processing and commercial work. The second was the unit for printing from half-inch magnetic tape. The design aim of Perseus was to enable large-scale data-processing, rather than scientific computing. It used the same electronic technology as the Ferranti Pegasus, similarly engineered. The envisaged applications would involve vast amounts of file data, for which 1/2" magnetic tape was provided. The word length was 72 bits, with 160 words of random-access memory provided by single-word nickel acoustic delay lines. Unlike Pegasus with its magnetic drum, further internal store was provided by 864, 16-word delay lines. Large-scale data input was provided by punched card readers available for both round- and rectangular-hole cards. Data output was via magnetic tape to an off-line unit equipped with 300 lines per minute Samastronic line printers.

== Old Mutual (South Africa) ==
The South African Mutual Life Assurance Society (Old Mutual) had a Perseus installed at their head office in Pinelands, Cape Town in 1960. It is considered one of the earliest computers in South Africa. Many years later an eagle-eyed employee spotted some of the decommissioned Perseus enclosures at the back of the building, ready to be scrapped. He discovered that they were in fact aluminium and stamped inside it said "Made by Rolls Royce"! The staff member purchased the about-to-be-scrapped enclosures for next to nothing and eventually built himself a sports car from the "Made by Rolls Royce" aluminium sheet metal! It is safe to assume that every Perseus sold was clad in enclosures made by Rolls Royce.

== Bibliography ==
- De Kerf, Joseph L. F. (April 1959), A Survey of British Digital Computers (Part 2) (PDF), vol. 8, Computers and Automation, pp. 34–36
- Hunt, P. M. (1 January 1959), "The Ferranti Perseus Data-Processing System" (PDF), The Computer Journal, 2 (2): 68–75, doi:10.1093/comjnl/2.2.68
- Lavington, Simon Hugh (1980), Early British Computers: The Story of Vintage Computers and the People who Built Them, Manchester University Press, ISBN 9780719008108
- Anon (5 March 1959), "To compute Swedish premiums", New Scientist, Reed Business Information
