= Multum =

- Manufacturer: Information Computer Systems
- Released: 1972
- Discontinued: 1973
- Units shipped: 2+
- CPU: 8 MHz, 16 bit MSI chip based
- Memory: up to 4 store modules of 128 KB

The Multum from Information Computer Systems (ICS) was a 16-bit minicomputer developed in the early 1970s in Crewe, Cheshire by ex-employees of English Electric Company. It had a very early port of Pascal.
