= GE-400 series =

GE 400
- Designer: General Electric
- Bits: 24-bit
- Introduced: 1964
- Design: CISC
- Type: Register-Memory; Memory-Memory
- Encoding: Fixed
- Branching: Condition indicators Compare and branch

Registers
- Accumulator; 6 index registers (in memory)
- General-purpose: none
- Floating-point: none

The GE-400 series is a series of time-sharing computers by General Electric introduced in 1964 and shipped until 1968.

== System description ==
The GE-400 series (Compatibles/400) came in models: 415, 425, 435 (1964), 455 and 465. GE-400 systems had a word length of 24 bits which could contain binary data, four six-bit BCD characters, three eight-bit (ASCII) characters or four signed decimal digits. GE-400 systems had magnetic-core memory with a cycle time of 2.7 microseconds (435) or 5.1 microseconds (425). The 425 and 435 had memory of 32k (32,768) words and 64k (65,536) words, respectively. The 455 and 465 had memory of 32k (32,768) words and 64k (65,536) words, respectively. As today's computers use bytes to designate memory size, the memory sizes of the GE-400 would be 98,304 bytes and 196,608 bytes. The systems supported up to eight channels for input/output.

The GE-425 GE-435 were batch computers with no communication capabilities. The GE-455 and GE-465 were the timesharing versions. These timesharing computers had a Datanet-30 front end to provide the communications capability at 110 baud originally (10 CPS) and later, with a later hardware upgrade, to handle 300 baud (30 CPS). The GE-465 was the most common version and supported up to 50 users simultaneously.

The GE 412 (1962) was an incompatible computer system with a 20-bit word length intended for process control applications.

== Unique features ==
GE-400 systems featured a "variable length, relocatable accumulator" which could be set programmatically to a length of one to four words and relocated to overlay any four adjacent locations in memory (modulo four). "The accumulator can be moved to the data to be processed, rather than moving the data."

== Successor systems ==
The 400 series was succeeded by the incompatible 36-bit GE-600 series.

== See also ==
- GE-200 series
- GE-600 series
