= Elliott 503 =

1960's computer

The Elliott 503 was a transistorized computer introduced by Elliott Brothers in 1963. It was software-compatible with the earlier Elliott 803 but was about 70 times faster and a more powerful machine. About 32 units were sold. The basic configuration had 8192 words of 39 bits each for main memory, and operated at a system clock speed of 6.7 megahertz. It weighed more than 4,050 pounds (2.0 short tons; 1.8 t).

The Elliott 503 was the first British computer to use the international computer programming language ALGOL. In 1962 it was advertised as costing less than 100 000 British pounds.

In 1970 the University of Tasmania was still using an Elliott 503 computer in its Mathematics department.

== See also ==
- List of transistorized computers
- Cluff–Foster–Idelson code
