= Model 109 =

Series

The Model 109, or Number 109, was a series of mainframe computers designed and built in the People's Republic of China, starting in 1964.

- First Model 109, created in 1964, used vacuum tubes
- The Model 109-B, China's first transistor computer was created in 1965.
- The Model 109-C followed in 1967, and was used for 15 years.

Those were followed by the Number 111, their first integrated circuit computer, in 1971.
