= Swinden House =

Building in Rotherham, South Yorkshire, England

Coordinates: 53.4154°N 1.3346°W

Swinden House in Rotherham, South Yorkshire, England is a Victorian style Grade II listed Victorian building. It is located on Tata Steel (formally British Steel then Corus) Swinden Technology Centre.

== Pre-steel 1880-1946 ==
It was built between 1878 and 1880 by Thomas W. Badger, a member of a well-known Rotherham family, prominent in legal circles. It was originally called Red House or as it was frequently termed the “palatial residence”. Several of the rooms on the ground floor are panelled in oak, which was obtained from Rotherham Parish Church during the construction of the house.

In 1882, Thomas Badger fled the country [reported by the Rotherham Advertiser], leaving his business in financial confusion and with heavy debts. The house was sold to William H. Micklethwait, the owner of an iron foundry at the Clough Works in Masbrough. His lived there until his death in 1925 and his widow continued to live there until she died in 1932.

The house remaining empty until 1939 when it was occupied by the National Fire service during the Second World War.

== Steel industry 1946-2005 ==
In 1946 it was purchased by United Steel, and the house was renamed Swinden House in tribute to the first director of research, Dr. T. Swinden. After considerable refurbishment the house became occupied by research staff.

Swinden House remained as a research centre for the next 60 years, changing ownership in 1995 to British Steel PLC, and then again in 1999 to Corus PLC as a result of the merger with Koninklijke Hoogovens. It is now owned by Tata Steel.

== National Metals Technology Centre (NAMTEC) and Swinden House Conference Centre 2005-2011 ==
In 2005 NAMTEC moved into Swinden House. Currently managing membership for the Special Metals Forum (SMF) and Titanium Information Group (TIG). NAMTEC also provides project management and technical consultancy for Advanced Engineering and Material companies. It also co-ordinates AEM Futures.

Swinden House now offers meeting rooms and conference facilities. The actual house is set within grounds near the M1 and M18, close to Rotherham Town Centre and Sheffield, making it a venue for local, regional and national meetings. Swinden House has 9 meeting rooms available which hold between 2-80 delegates.
