= Summation check =

Telecommunication term

In telecommunications, the term summation check (sum check) has the following meanings:

- A checksum based on the formation of the sum of the digits of a numeral.
  - Note: The sum of the individual digits is usually compared with a previously computed value.
- A comparison of checksums on the same data on different occasions or on different representations of the data in order to verify data integrity.
