= Digico (computer company) =

Digico Limited
- Trade name: digico, DIGICO Computers
- Industry: Computer hardware
- Founded: 1965
- Founders: Keith Trickett and Avo Hiiemae
- Defunct: January 30, 1984 (as independent company)
- Fate: acquired from the receiver by Centreway Industries plc
- Headquarters: Stevenage, United Kingdom
- Key people: Eric Lubbock (chairman)
- Products: data loggers, minicomputers, microcomputers

Digico was a British computer company founded in 1965. Digico was best known for its 16-bit minicomputer series, the Micro 16. Later Digico started manufacturing a networked CP/M based microcomputer system with business software options, named Digico Prince.

== Company history ==
Digico was founded in 1965 by Keith Trickett and Avo Hiiemae, two ex-ICL electronics engineers. Former MP Eric Lubbock was chairman from 1969 to 1983. The company was based in Letchworth initially, moving to a new factory in Stevenage in 1973 and employing about 90 staff.

Digico's first product was a laboratory data-logging and spectrum analyser hardware system named DIGIAC. A prototype had been developed before Digico was formed, by the founders in a garage, so became an immediate source of income. Digico soon developed a 16-bit minicomputer series, the Micro 16, for which it was best known for.

In 1974 Digico had a turnover of over £1 million (equivalent to £9 million in 2025) and in 1977 well over £1 million.

Spanverne Investments raised a large private capital investment into Digico in 1981, while the new Prince product was being developed.

In October 1982, Digico announced it would close its Stevenage factory with the loss of 130 jobs within six months. This was part of a rationalisation plan to concentrate manufacturing at its large Leeds site. It would retain its Letchworth site primarily as a south England office.

On 1 February 1984, the Financial Times reported that after a weekend of failed negotiation between British computer company Optim and Midland Bank, Digico went into receivership on 30 January 1984. Digico owed more that £400,000 to Midland Bank and over £1 million to other creditors. In 1983 debts to the bank had reached about £1.4 million, but were reduced when Optim bought Digico's maintenance contracts with about 1,500 customers for £750,000 in autumn 1983. The company had lost £2.5 million over the previous two years on an annual turnover of about £4 million (equivalent to £13,600,000 in 2025), and had closed its Letchworth factory retaining about 50 employees.

Digico was acquired from the receiver by Centreway Industries plc for £265,000 in March 1984 and merged into its computer group.

== Digico Micro 16 ==
Digico quickly started developing a general purpose 16-bit minicomputer, the Micro 16, which became available in 1966. Digico was assisted by the Ministry of Technology and the National Research Development Corporation in this development. The first version produced was the Digico Micro 16S (1968), followed by the 16P (1970), then the 16V in 1972.

Example applications
available for Micro 16V
Animal feed mix control
Car park control
Census analysis
Electroencephalography
Gas chromatography
ICL 1900 front ending
Invoicing
Machine tool control
Mass spectrometry
Stock control
Typesetting

The Digico Micro 16V had a standard memory of 4k words with 950 nano second cycle time, expandable to 64k words, and able to support up to 64 external interfaces. It had an optional microprogrammed floating-point unit. The Micro 16V was supported by a simple and flexibly sized executive that could optionally support multiprogramming, disc files and teletypes. The Micro 16V used semiconductor memory, rather than magnetic-core memory as in the previous models.

The instruction set architecture is single accumulator based with instructions generally having a consistent 12-bit address field. A direct address thus limits memory size to 4k (4096) words in the current selected memory region, named a "stack". Three instructions (load, store, add) permit indirect addressing where the direct address contains the 16-bit address of the operand. A carry register supports multi-word arithmetic; there is no integer multiply or divide instruction. One instruction uses the address field to specify a variety of non-addressing sub-instructions such as shift, carry manipulation and input-output. Floating-point arithmetic is handled by software or an optional floating-point unit with its own registers that can work in 32, 48 or 80-bit modes.

The Micro 16 sold primarily into the data logging market until 1969, when it expanded into areas like process control, stock control and front-end processors for the ICL 1900 mainframe.

In 1978 the Digico Micro 16E stackable minicomputer, which was well suited to an office environment, won a Design Council Award for Engineering Products.

== Digico Prince ==
In 1981, Digico started manufacturing a CP/M based microcomputer with business software options, named Digico Prince, with a claimed unique seven year maintenance guarantee.

A more sophisticated multi-user Digico Prince II system was also available. The Digico 3800 user terminal had three Zilog Z80A processors, 64 kilo-bytes of memory and optionally two floppy disk drives. Up to three Digico 3800s could be connected to a 3810, 3820 or 3830 master workstation with a shared 5 MB Winchester disk drive. Up to 32 of these clusters could further be connected locally or remotely to a Digico 7800 server based on a Digico Micro 16E, providing more shared disc capacity and remote access to IBM, ICL and Honeywell mainframe computers.

== See also ==
- Computer Technology Limited
- PDP-8
