= DATANET-30 =

General Electric communications computer (1960s)

The DATANET-30, or DN-30 for short, was a computer manufactured by General Electric and designed in 1961-1963 to be used as a communications computer. It was the first front-end communications computer, and was later used as a front-end processor for data communications. The names on the patent were Don Birmingham, Bob McKenzie, Bud Pine, and Bill Hill.

Beginning in 1963, the first freestanding installations were Chrysler Corporation message switching systems, replacing Teletype punched tape systems. In 1964, acting as a front end processor along with an interface to the GE-225 computer, a professor at Dartmouth College developed the BASIC programming language. Multiple teletype units were attached to be the first time-sharing system at Dartmouth.

The DATANET-30 used magnetic-core memory with a cycle time of 6.94 μs. The word size was 18 bits and memory was available in sizes of 4K, 8K, or 16K words. The system could attach up to 128 asynchronous terminals, nominally at speeds of up to "3000 bits per second" (bit/s), but usually limited to the 300 bit/s supported by standard common-carrier facilities of the time, such as the Bell 103 modem.

The DATANET-30 could also operate in synchronous mode at speeds up to 2400 bit/s.

A Computer Interface Unit allowed the DATANET-30 to communicate with a GE-200 series computer using direct memory access (DMA). It could also attach to the I/O channel of a GE-400 series, or GE-600 series system.

An optional attachment allowed the DATANET-30 to attach GE-200 series peripherals such as disk storage, magnetic tape, or a line printer.

The system was also a general purpose computer, with a number of special-purpose hardware registers. The instruction set contained 78 instructions.

Assemblers were provided for the DATANET-30, one of which could run on the DATANET itself and one on the GE-225.
