= GE-200 series =

Small mainframe computer series (1960s)

GE 210 advertisement from 1960

The GE-200 series is a family of small mainframe computers built by General Electric (GE) in the 1960s. GE marketing called the line Compatibles/200 (GE-205/215/225/235). The GE-210 of 1960 was not compatible with the rest of the 200 series.

== 200 series models ==
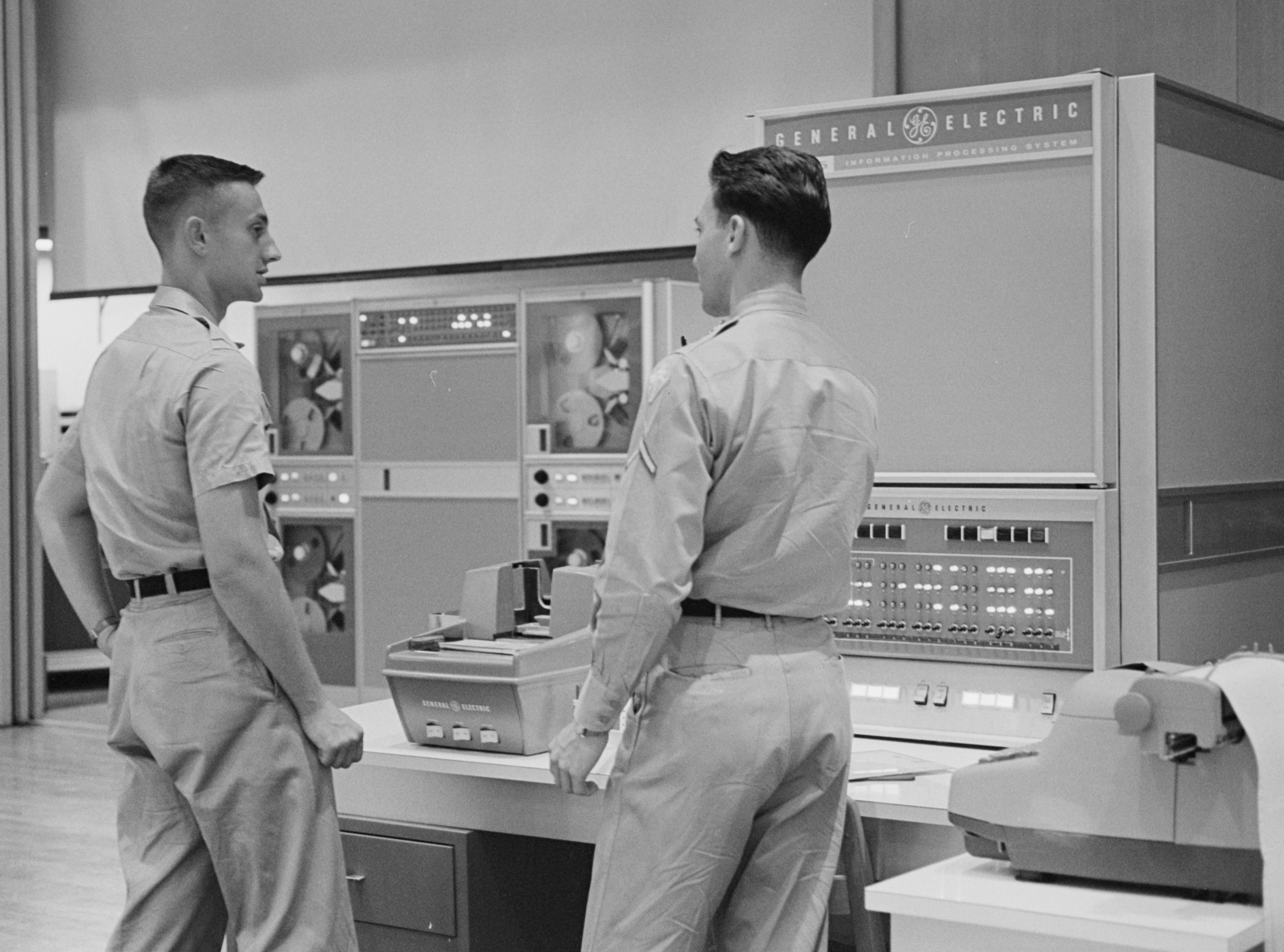
A GE-200 series in use at West Point, 1963

The main machine in the line is the GE-225 (1961). It uses a 20-bit word, of which 13 bits could be used for an address. Along with the basic central processing unit (CPU) the system could also have had a floating-point unit (the "Auxiliary Arithmetic Unit"), or a fixed-point decimal option with three six-bit decimal digits per word. It had eleven I/O channel controllers, and GE sold a variety of add-ons including disks, printers, and other devices. The machines were built using discrete transistors, with a typical machine containing about 10,000 transistors and 20,000 diodes. They used magnetic-core memory, and a standard 8 kiloword system held 186,000 magnetic cores. They weighed about 2,000 pounds (1.0 short ton; 910 kg).

The GE-215 (1963) was a scaled-down version of the GE-225, including only six I/O channels and only 4 kilowords or 8 kilowords of core memory.

The GE-205 (1964).

The GE-235 (1964) was a re-implementation of the GE-225 with three times faster memory than the original. The GE-235 consisted of several major components and options:

- Central processor
- 400 card-per-minute (CPM) or 1000 CPM card reader
- 100 CPM card punch or 300 CPM card punch
- Perforated tape subsystem
- Magnetic tape subsystem
- 12-pocket high-speed document handler
- On-line high-speed printer or off/on-line speed printer
- Disc storage unit
- Auxiliary Arithmetic Logic Unit (ALU)
- DATANET data communications equipment

== Background ==
The series was designed by a team led by Homer R. “Barney” Oldfield, and which included Arnold Spielberg (father of film director Steven Spielberg). GE chairman Ralph J. Cordiner had forbidden GE from entering the general-purpose computer business, rejecting several proposals by Oldfield by simply writing "No" across them and sending them back. Oldfield, somewhat deceptively, claimed that the GE-200 series would be industrial control computers. By the time Cordiner found out otherwise, it was too late and the machine was in production; Cordiner fired Oldfield at the product rollout. Even though the machine was selling well, Cordiner ordered that GE leave the computer business within 18 months (it actually took several years).

== Dartmouth Time-Sharing System ==
Through the early 1960s GE worked with Dartmouth College on the development of a time-sharing operating system, which would later go on to become the Dartmouth Time-Sharing System (DTSS). The system was constructed by attaching a number of teletypewriters to a smaller GE machine called the DATANET-30 (DN-30), which was a small computer that had evolved from an earlier process-control machine.

DTSS actually ran on the DN-30. The DN-30 accepted commands one at a time from the terminals connected to it, and then ran their requested programs on the GE-235. The GE-235 had no idea it was not running in batch mode, and the illusion of multitasking was being maintained externally.

In 1965 GE started packaging the DN-30 and GE-235 systems together as the GE-265. The GE-265 achieved fame not only for being the first commercially successful time-sharing system, but it was also the machine on which the BASIC programming language was created.

== See also ==
- GE-400 series
- GE-600 series
