= DM1 =

DM1 can refer to

- Diabetes mellitus type 1
- A form of Myotonic dystrophy
- Myotonin-protein kinase, that is, dystrophia myotonica 1 or dystrophia myotonica protein kinase, a ubiquitous protein whose abnormal expression is associated with myotonic dystrophy in ways not yet well understood
- Mertansine, a maytansinoid cytotoxic agent used in trastuzumab emtansine and other antibody-drug conjugates
- The Lippisch DM-1 a German delta wing research glider
- An office based variant of the ICL Series 39 mainframe manufactured by International Computers Limited (ICL) in the 1980s
- SpaceX DM1, an orbital test of Dragon 2 spacecraft
- DM-1, one of the designations carried by a US Navy destroyer
