= ICL Direct Machine Environment =

Computing mainframe environment

Direct Machine Environment, abbreviated DME, was a mainframe environment for microcode based versions of the ICL 2900 Series (2960 and the second-generation S-Series) of computing systems from International Computers Limited that was developed in the 1970s. DME was more-or-less an ICL 1900 order code processor in microcode, which permitted the ICL 1900 series executive, operating systems and program libraries to operate on the ICL 2900 series.

The ICL 2905 was a rebrand of the ICL 2950 that only ran DME/2, the second version of DME, introduced for marketing reasons.

== Reason for Development ==
At this time most companies that had computers had large teams of programmers to write their applications. DME was developed so that customers could buy the new hardware and run their 1900 or System 4 applications whilst they developed their replacement VME applications. This led to some users running DME and VME alternately on the same machine for some years. Unfortunately this led to situations where development teams were waiting around for time to run their new applications. This, and the fact that some users were not moving to the new system, led ICL to develop a system called Concurrent Machine Environment (CME) under which VME ran DME as a subsystem, enabling 1900 and System 4 applications to be run on a 2900 or Series 39 machine alongside VME applications.
