= GEORGE (operating system) =

Series of operating systems

- Developer: International Computers and Tabulators
- Written in: Assembly language
- Working state: Historic
- Source model: Source available to licensees.
- Initial release: 1960s
- Latest release: 8,67 / 1985; 41 years ago
- Available in: English
- Supported platforms: ICT 1900 series of computers
- Kernel type: Monolithic
- Influenced by: Multics
- Default user interface: CLI (teletype or block mode terminal)
- License: Proprietary commercial software

GEORGE was the name given to a series of operating systems released by International Computers and Tabulators (ICT) in the 1960s, for the ICT 1900 series of computers. These included GEORGE 1, GEORGE 2, GEORGE 3, and GEORGE 4.

Initially, the 1900 series machines, like the Ferranti-Packard 6000 on which they were based, ran a simple operating system known as Executive, which allowed the system operator to load and run programs from a Teletype Model 33 ASR based system console.

In December 1964, ICT set up an Operating Systems Branch to develop a new operating system for the 1906/7. The branch was initially staffed with people being released by the end of work on the OMP operating system for the Ferranti Orion. The initial design of the new system, named George after the head of the Basic Programming Division George E. Felton, (Note: In "Another ICL Anthology" George Felton explains the origin of the name as follows: "About January 1965, there was a meeting in my office, while I was away abroad, discussing different ways of allotting functions between the proposed operating system and Executive. Scheme A was discussed and rejected. Scheme B ditto. And Schemes C, D, E and F were also discarded in quick succession. When Scheme G came up, everybody was happy, and it was decided to adopt it. The "GEneral ORGanisational Environment' was also quickly formulated as the official expansion of the acronym. But the name 'GEORGE' was in any case a natural choice: it had echoes of aircraft autopilots; it was a bit of fun; and I certainly wasn't going to object".) was based on ideas from the Orion and the spooling system of the Atlas computer. In public it was claimed that George stood for GEneral ORGanisational Environment, but contemporary sources say that was a backronym.

In July 1965, a team from ICT was present at a seminar at NPL describing the CTSS operating system developed for MIT's Project MAC. They decided that the ICT would need to provide multi-access facilities, known to ICT as MOP, "Multiple Online Processing". In November 1965 H. P. Goodman, head of the Operating Systems Branch attended the Fall Joint Computer Conference in Las Vegas where plans for Multics were initially described. Some of the Multics features discussed influenced future development of George, notably the tree structured filestore.

Towards the end of 1965, ICT marketing requested that a simpler operating system be made available quickly, especially for the smaller members of the range. It was decided that two smaller systems, known as George 1 and George 2 be released rapidly, and the larger operating system was renamed George 3.

== GEORGE 1 & 2 ==
George 1 was a simple batch processing system, Job descriptions were read from cards or paper tape which controlled the loading and running of programs, either loaded from cards or paper tape or magnetic tape. The job control language allowed definition of the peripherals and files to be used and handling of exception conditions. The job description would be checked for errors before the job was run. George used the trusted program facilities provided by executive to run the user programs.

George 2 added the concept of off line peripheral handling (spooling). Several different modules, running in parallel, allowed overlapping of input, processing and output operations:

- Jobs were read from cards or paper tape to temporary files on magnetic disk or tape by an input module.
- A central module executed the user programs, taking input from the temporary input files and writing program output to temporary files.
- An output module wrote the temporary output files to physical printers and punches.
- A module was also available for entering jobs from remote job entry stations, the output of the job could be printed on the remote printer.

If the installation was large enough multiple copies of the central module could be run, allowing multiple jobs to be processed in parallel.

The George 2 job control language allowed use of stored macros with conditional facilities.

George 2 provided no file system, the system and user programs relied on the facilities provided by executive. Files on disk were accessed by unique 12 character names and no security other than a "do not erase" bit was provided.

MINIMOP could be run simultaneously with GEORGE 2 on the same machine, to provide on-line time-sharing facilities.

== GEORGE 3 & 4 ==
GEORGE 3 was the main version of the operating system series for the larger machines of the 1900 series. Initially it was released for the 1906/7; eventually it was made available for models down to the 1902T. In contrast to George 1 & 2 which ran as user-mode programs under executive, George 3 was a full operating system, leaving only low-level peripheral and interrupt handling to a cut-down version of executive.

George 3 was implemented as a small memory-resident part and a collection of chapters (overlays) which were loaded into and removed from memory as needed. Chapters were strictly location-independent, allowing best use of memory. Internally George used cooperative multitasking; context switches could take place at any chapter change (call from one chapter to another), or at other specified places in the code. User-level code was run using preemptive multitasking; context switches were forced on I/O operations or clock ticks.

George was written in a special assembler, GIN (George INput), which had richer conditional compilation and macro facilities than the standard PLAN assembler. Macros were heavily used by the code to reduce the effort of programming such a large system in assembly language. In later versions the macro features of GIN were used to add structured programming features to the code. Writing the system was estimated to have taken 75 programmer-years of effort.

=== Job control ===
George 3 was a mixed batch and online system. Jobs could be run from cards or tape in the same manner as George 2, or interactively from MOP (Multiple Online Processing) terminals, either simple Teletype Model 33 ASR terminals or block mode VDU terminals.

The job control language was the same on terminals or in batch jobs and included conditional operations and macro operations. In contrast to Unix systems the job control language was part of the operating system rather than being a user level shell process.

A job could only have one program loaded in to memory at a time, but one job could start other jobs to run concurrently, if system resources and site policy would permit. The system would swap user programs out of memory while they were waiting for input or output if other activities required memory to run.

=== Filestore ===
George 3 provided a tree structured Filestore, inspired in part by Multics.

Every user of the system had a home directory with as many sub directories as needed under it. A users home directory could be accessed directly, for example the directory for user JOHN could be referred to as :JOHN, or by a full path, for example if JOHN was in the computer science department his home directory might be :MANAGER.USERS.COMPSCI.JOHN.

Access control lists were used for security, a user could permit or deny any user or group of users access to his files or directories.

File data storage was two-level: files could be either currently on disk, or, if the system was low on disk space they could be automatically relegated to magnetic tape. If an attempt was made to access a currently off line file the job would be suspended and the operators requested to load the appropriate tape. When the tape was made available the file would be brought back to disk and the job resumed.

The underlying disc storage mechanism George 3, in 1968, was probably the earliest commercial version of a Copy-On-Write file system. The way this worked was that all modified blocks would be written to blocks on a "free" list. Blocks containing metadata were also treated in the same way but were, together with data blocks, physically written in an order in such a way that, when the final "master" block had been written, the file was committed. If the machine failed at any point, it was guaranteed by the hardware that the file would be in either its original, unmodified, form or fully up to date.

Another useful feature was that the Filestore could emulate all the standard peripherals, such as card readers and punches, magnetic tapes and discs. This allowed older George 1 & 2 programs that required these physical devices, to be run under George 3 without modification. This could speed up jobs that required many tape or disc changes on George 1 & 2 to be automated to the extent that something that had required two operators, several tens of tape changes and five hours, now required no operators, other than for mounting two work tapes for the results, and finished in 45 minutes.

=== George 4 ===
Starting with the 1904A, a paging unit was available for larger 1900 processors and George 4 was written to take advantage of it. George 4 remained compatible with George 3. It was common to alternate George 3 and 4 on the same machine and filestore, running George 3 during the day for small, interactive workloads and George 4 at night for large, memory intensive, jobs.

George 4 introduced the concept of a sparse program, a program that had an addressing space larger than its allocated memory and read-only (pure) data and code regions. New versions of the consolidator (linker) and compilers were provided to use these facilities.

The source code of George 3 and 4 were the same; conditional compilation facilities of the GIN assembler were used to select which version of the system was being compiled.

As the 1900 paging feature was not emulated by the 2900 series machines used by later George installations, George 4 fell out of use before George 3.

=== Source code ===
George was distributed in a form that allowed a site to modify large parts of the system. A compilation of the system was started, then interrupted just before the end and dumped to magnetic tape. The GIN compiler allowed the compilation to be continued from this point at the user site, possibly modifying code already compiled.

Versions of George 3 before release 8 were provided in binary form. Any modifications needed to the system were made as binary patches. To simplify the process most George chapters included an empty MEND area at the end.

Starting with release 8 the source of George was distributed with the binary, both on magnetic tape and microfiche. A system of source level patches, known as MENDITS was used to modify the system and an existing chapter could be completely replaced by the new modified chapter.

The George user group set up a "MEND exchange scheme" to share interesting modifications to George. Some modifications were distributed freely, others were available for a fee. When ICL produced a new version of George they would sometimes include modifications produced by the users.

For the last released version, 8.67, most of the patches from the MEND exchange scheme were included in the standard George source, switched off by conditional compilation. They can be turned on as part of the standard process of tailoring George for a site.

=== Documentation ===
George was well documented internally in a series of looseleaf folders, distributed as an initial version plus amendments. Eventually all the original pages were replaced, so any new copy of the manuals consisted of a box of empty looseleaf folders and a pile of amendments. The first amendment was a list of contributors, and the technical reason for the amendment was described as "to keep everyone happy".

=== Modified Versions ===
A modified version of George 3 was supplied to the University of Manchester Regional Computer Centre (UMRCC). This linked George 3 to a CDC Cyber machine, to which George supplied the offline I/O and Job queueing functions. Online support was supplied by both ICL and Cyber for both hardware and software. The Cyber support team worked in an office with the name "Cybermen" on the door.

=== End of life ===
==== Obsolescence ====
With the release of ICL's "new range", the 2900 series with its VME operating system, George became obsolete. However, due to the legacy of investment in software for George, ICL released options to run 1900 series software, including George, on 2900 series machines, initially the Direct Machine Environment (DME), later the Concurrent Machine Environment (CME) which allowed simultaneous running of 1900 and 2900 code on the same system.

New versions of George 3 continued to be released for the 2900. The last version was 8.67, released in 1983.

As of 2005 at least one site in Russia was still running George 3 under DME.

In November 2014 George 3 was run on a reconditioned ICL 2966 at the National Museum of Computing.

==== Emulation ====
David Holdsworth and Delwyn Holroyd obtained copies of George 3 issue tapes when the last live site in the UK, at British Steel Corporation, was being decommissioned and wrote an emulator for the 1900 hardware and executive that allows running of George on Microsoft Windows and Linux as part of a project for the Computer Conservation Society.
