= Cotley =

Cotley may refer to:

- Cotley Castle, large Iron Age Hill fort near Dunchideock in Devon, England
- Cotley River, small river in Taunton and Berkley, Massachusetts, USA, a tributary of the Taunton River
- Scratchbury and Cotley Hills SSSI, biological Site of Special Scientific Interest at Norton Bavant in Wiltshire, England

== See also ==
- Coley (disambiguation)
- Costley
- Courtley
