= ICL 7500 series =

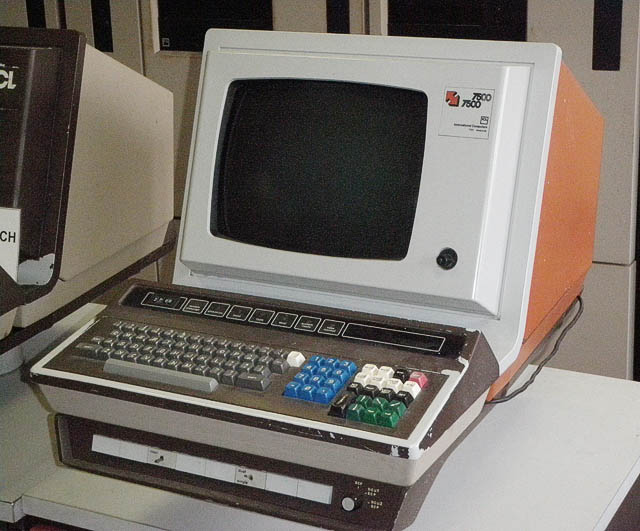
ICL 7561 workstation

The ICL 7500 series (7501, 7502, 7503, 7561, etc.) was a range of terminals and workstations, that were developed by ICL during the 1970s for their new range ICL 2900 Series mainframe computers. The colour scheme was compatible with the 2900. The term 7561 is a commonly used though loose term for the interactive video aspects of the 7502 series. The 7501 and 7502 systems were known as Modular Terminal Processors in marketing publications. 7501 and 7502 systems were built at Blackhorse Road, Letchworth (1/3 factory).

7502 consisted of a system enclosure containing up to eight PCB's (CPU card, memory cards, peripheral controllers and video cards). It was similar in size to a desk side or tower PC, but was mounted horizontally. As it was intended to function in an office environment, steel-framed, wood-veneered cabinets and furniture were available for the processor and peripheral units. The 7502 system enclosure had two levels to include space for the dual, 8-inch floppy disk unit. The interior of the cabinet was covered with acoustic-absorbent foam material to cut the noise from the cooling fans. The maximum connectivity was 8 x 7561 VDU stations and four serial printers, but in the early systems it was necessary to reduce the VDU attachments if floppy disk storage was attached. The rear of the 7502 system carried the connectors for VDUs, modem and serial printers and a set of 8 "engineer's switches" which could be used to input data and set options for "teleloading" software.

7501 comprised a smaller enclosure integrated beneath a 7561 VDU terminal. It had only 5 card slots in the backplane and offered reduced connectivity with only one additional VDU terminal possible. A narrow operator's console with indicators, rotary-switch and modem control switches was implemented below the VDU screen bezel.

7501 and 7502 were functionally the same and shared identical interfaces and system software. A 4 Kbyte read-only memory (ROM) in the normal address space provided a system bootstrap capable of downloading the operating software over the normal synchronous communications line, loading or dumping from/to local floppy disk or providing a local engineer's console. For diagnostic purposes an Engineer's Test Unit could be installed between the CPU card and the backplane. This gave the engineer full capability of reading and writing registers or memory and single-stepping machine code or CPU microcode. A digital cassette tape device could be used to load test or operating software.

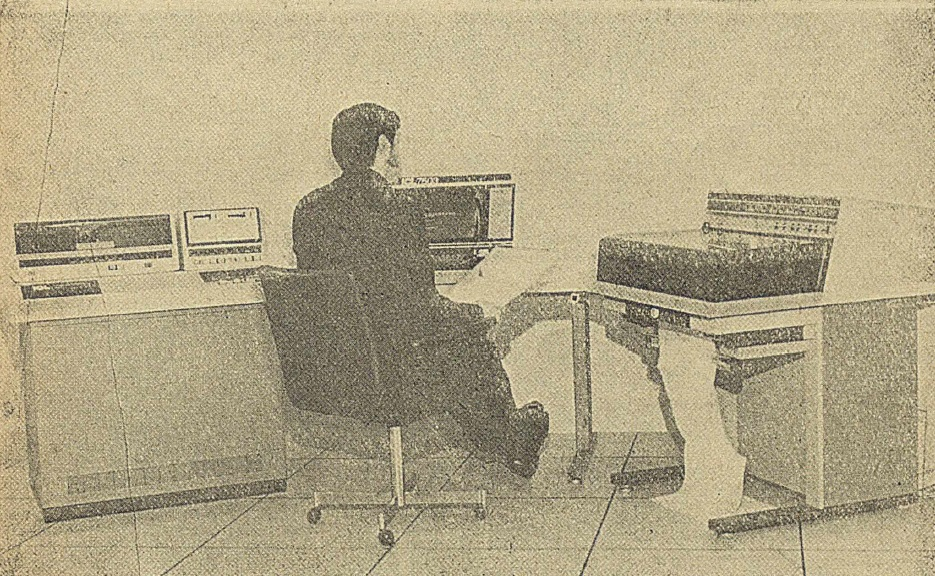
ICL 7503 station

7503 was similar to 7502 but was normally used as for Remote Job Entry. It featured a line printer, card reader and operator console integrated into a larger operators desk. It used totally different hardware and architecture for its processing system. 7503 was developed by a team in Stevenage, while 7502 was developed in Kidsgrove.

7561 VDUs were memory-mapped display monitors, and not character-based terminals. The tube phosphor was green in colour. The keyboards were separate input/output devices whose data was decoded by the operating software to update the screen display or trigger actions by the system. Security identifiers (Personal Identity Device, or PID) based on magnetically-coded pens with a reader at the top right corner of the keyboard unit could be used to provide levels of access-privilege to users. Early 7561/1 VDUs had simple composite-video inputs, while the updated 7561/2 VDU had improved display tubes and interlaced scan. The native screen resolution was 25 lines of 80 characters, but there were options for a 960-character display format.

7502 used a much closer integration between the processor and the display driver circuits. In 7503, the screen updates involved the processor specifying a screen address to the display driver cards, and then firing a sequence of characters to be stored in consecutive locations starting at the specified address. The display driver hardware included hardware registers to track where the next character was to be placed. In 7502, the display memory was part of the processors' normal memory space. This meant that the processor could read or write any screen location directly.

7502 had a number of command functions that allowed the processor to manipulate blocks of memory directly. This allowed the 7502 to move data on the screen very quickly, such as when the screen contents were to be scrolled up, or for rapidly clearing the screen. Similar functions also allowed the screen attributes to be amended in bulk, such as setting blocks of text to flash or to be displayed in italics.

To improve normal processing speed, 7502 used two sets of 16-bit registers. Each set had 16 registers, with 15 being used for general purpose operations, and the last one used as an instruction pointer. All writes went to both register sets, but reads were taken from one set with a simultaneous read of a different register being possible from the second set. When an interrupt occurred, one register set was frozen, and the second set was diverted to process the interrupt. After the interrupt was completed, the frozen set was copied back to the second set to resume normal operation. During interrupt processing, special functions allowed the frozen registers to be backed up to memory and different contents to be loaded to switch to a different process. The block manipulating functions described above were able to accept an interrupt part way through their execution so that manipulating very large blocks did not adversely affect interrupt processing.

7501 and 7502 used 132-column, dot-matrix printers with a serial interface. Different print speed options were offered by the various models. Most common were the 7574 (Drico), or 7576 models but legacy devices such as the "Termiprinter" could also be attached. In later years, more capable printers such as the Okidata Microline series became available. The 7503 was often connected to a card reader/punch and a medium-speed line printer, but as its popularity declined the 7502 became available with the bought-in PBS "Band Printer" with 360 or 720 lines per minute printing speed. This connectivity was a consequence of the 7502's implementation on the "Slow X2 Highway" bus system, which was also found in the 2900 Series DCU.

Storage for all three systems was 8-inch floppy drives made by CDC, although 7502 was most often used without a floppy disk, as it could download its operational software from the mainframe over its serial communication line. This was referred as "teleloading". Operational software was referred to as a Terminal Executive (TE), and would vary depending upon the functions required, mainframe connection and communications protocol employed. The TEs for standard protocols and functions were written and maintained by the Kidsgrove software team, but Letchworth Development Centre made a niche market of modifying TEs for special purposes. Variants for communication with IBM mainframes, X.25 networks and the Counter Terminal System for Anglia Building Society and Local Government sector were examples. A separate development was the WORDSKIL word-processor system which was based upon 7502 hardware with dual or quadruple single-density floppy disks, portrait-format VDU and the Qume "Daisy-wheel" printer.

The role of the Terminal Processing Systems was essentially that of a communications front-end, and all computing functions were provided by the mainframe application. The workstations had limited processing facilities, including field validation, such as for alphabetic content and numeric content (with a range of check digit validations). No user-software capability was included in the TEs. However, as the trend to distributed applications developed, an end-user programming capability was introduced under the name Transaction Processing Language (TPL). Screen forms could be defined and applications could be coded using development tools that were based in the same paradigm. Applications could be stored locally on floppy disk and low-priority transaction data spooled for transmission when a mainframe link was available, or at night when traffic was otherwise light. Applications were written by ICL partner companies and use of the development tools was not mainstream.

The natural ingenuity of the 7500 series software developers resulted in the appearance in the early 1980s of highly specialised TEs such as Pac-Man and Space Invaders, for which the fast screen-handling abilities of the hardware was ideal. How far these games spread is unknown, but as the TEs were single-function loading Space Invaders would be obvious from the cessation of the normal front-end processes.

The 7500 series was largely superseded by the ICL DRS series.
