= JEAN =

Dialect of the JOSS programming language

JEAN was a dialect of the JOSS programming language developed for and used on ICT 1900 series computers in the late 1960s and early 1970s; it was implemented under the MINIMOP operating system. It was used at universities including the University of Southampton. The name was an acronym derived from "JOSS Extended and Adapted for Nineteen-hundred". It was operated interactively from a Teletype terminal, as opposed to using batch processing.

JEAN programs could include expressions (such as A*(B+C)), commands (such as TYPE to display the result of a calculation) and clauses (such as FOR, appended to an expression to evaluate it repeatedly).
