= Peter Bonfield =

British businessman (born 1944)

Bonfield in 2011

Sir Peter Leahy Bonfield CBE FREng (born 3 June 1944) is a business executive who has led a number of companies in the fields of electronics, computers and communications. Currently a director of several companies in the USA, Europe and the Far East, he was formerly chief executive of ICL and more recently of BT Group. He is a Fellow of the Royal Academy of Engineering, the Institution of Engineering and Technology, the British Computer Society, the Chartered Institute of Marketing, the Marketing Society and the Royal Society of Arts. He is a Liveryman of The Worshipful Company of Information Technologists, Freeman of the City of London, Honorary Citizen of Dallas, Texas and Member of the Pilgrims of Great Britain.

== Early life ==
The third son of an engineer and his Welsh wife, Bonfield was brought up in Baldock in Hertfordshire and educated at Hitchin Boys Grammar School. Bonfield graduated from Loughborough University with an engineering degree.

== Career ==
Peter Bonfield began his career with the American company Texas Instruments, in their Bedford (England) semiconductor plant, where he held various design, manufacturing and management roles. In 1984, on its takeover by Standard Telephones and Cables (STC plc), Bonfield was appointed chairman and managing director of International Computers Limited (ICL plc). He remained as chief executive of ICL until the end of 1995, seeing the company through a period when STC sold most of its stake in the company to Fujitsu.

In 1996 he was appointed CEO and Chairman of the Executive Committee of British Telecommunications plc, where he served until early 2002. Promising a "rollercoaster ride", during Bonfield's tenure the share price went from £4 to £15, and back again to £5. Bonfield's salary to 31 March 2001, was a basic of £780,000 (increasing to £820,000) plus a £481,000 bonus and £50,000 of other benefits including pension. He also received a deferred bonus, payable in shares in three years' time, of £481,000, and additional bonuses of £3.3 million.

Bonfield is presently Chairman of Dutch semiconductor firm NXP Semiconductors, Chair of Council and Senior Pro-Chancellor, Loughborough University, UK, a director of: L.M. Ericsson (Sweden), TSMC (Taiwan), Mentor Graphics (USA), a member of The Longreach Group Advisory Board (Japan), Senior Advisor Rothschild (London) and Board Mentor CMI (Brussels), chairman of the board East West Institute, UK, Chairman Small Business Charter, Director Global Logic Inc, USA, Member of Silent Circle Advisory Board, USA.

Previous positions include Director of Sony Corporation, Tokyo, Japan, member of New Venture Partners Advisory Board, USA, Advisor Apax Partners LLP, London, Citi International Advisory Board (USA), director of Dubai International Capital (Dubai), a senior non-executive director of AstraZeneca Group PLC, London, directorships at BICC plc, DESC Ltd, mm02plc, The Department of Constitutional Affairs and The Ministry of Justice, member of the Trilateral Commission, member of the Civil Service College Advisory Board, member of the High Level Working Group of the European Information Society, member of the Steering Group of the European Round Table and member of the EU-Japan Business Dialogue Round Table.

== Recognition ==
Bonfield was elected fellow of the Royal Academy of Engineering UK in 1993. He was honoured as a Commander of the Order of the British Empire in 1988, and subsequently dubbed a Knight Bachelor by Queen Elizabeth II in 1996.

In 1995, he was awarded the Mountbatten Medal. In July 1997, he was awarded an Honorary Degree from the Open University and holds 11 Honorary Doctorates in total. In 2001, he was awarded the first Internet Villain Award at the third annual Internet Industry Awards.

Other awards and honours include the Order of the Lion of Finland, the Gold Medal from The Institute of Management and Outstanding Executive from Texas Tech University (USA).
