= MINIMOP =

Time-sharing operating system

MINIMOP was an operating system which ran on the International Computers Limited (ICL) 1900 series of computers. MINIMOP provided an on-line, time-sharing environment (Multiple Online Programming (MOP) in ICL terminology), and typically ran alongside George 2 running batch jobs. MINIMOP was named to reflect its role as an alternative to the MOP facilities of George 3, which required a more powerful machine.

MINIMOP would run on any 1900 series processor apart from the low-end 1901 and 1902 and required only 16K words of memory and two 4 or 8 million character magnetic disks.

Each user was provided with a fixed size file to hold his data, which was subdivided into a number of variable sized subfiles. The command language could be extended with simple macros.

== Implementation ==
MINIMOP was implemented as a multithreaded (sub-programmed in ICL terminology) user level program running on the standard executive (low level operating system) of the ICL 1900. The program under control facilities of executive were used to run user programs under MINIMOP. All user I/O operations were trapped by MINIMOP and emulated rather than accessing real peripherals. As memory was at a premium user programs would be swapped out of memory whenever they needed to wait (for input or output) or when they reached the end of their time slice.

== MAXIMOP ==
Queen Mary College, London, now Queen Mary, University of London, later developed MAXIMOP, an improved system largely compatible with MINIMOP. The ICL Universities Sales Region started distributing MAXIMOP, and it was used at over 100 sites.
