= Courtley =

Courtley is a surname. Notable people with the surname include:

- Cade Courtley (born 1969), American television host and former Navy SEAL
- David Courtley, Chief Executive Officer of Fujitsu Services
- Steve Courtley, Australian visual effects artist

== See also ==
- Courtney (surname)
