= David Courtley =

David Courtley was the chief executive officer of Fujitsu Services (formerly ICL)

He joined Fujitsu Services as Chief Operating Officer in July 2001 and moved to the CEO position in April 2004, replacing Richard Christou who moved to the role of chairman.

David Courtley resigned from Fujitsu on 10 December 2008. Richard Christou took over duties of CEO on an interim basis, ultimately being replaced by Roger Gilbert.

Under David Courtley's leadership, Fujitsu Services experienced rapid growth and revenue for the financial year 2005-06 was £2.3 billion, with profits of £153 million, some 50% higher than the previous year. During this period Fujitsu Services has also entrenched its position as the IT services provider of choice for the UK Government, winning several large outsourcing contracts, including those for the Inland Revenue, MOD and large parts of the NHS.

In his final year of tenure David Courtley was based at Fujitsu Services' headquarters in Baker Street, London, and resided in London. David listed supporting Derby County, listening to music and riding his bike to work as his hobbies.

== Charitable Associations ==
David Courtley currently sits on the board of trustees for Charity SkillForce.

Business positions
Preceded by Richard Christou	Chief Executive Officer of Fujitsu Services; 2004-2008;	Succeeded by Richard Christou (Interim)
