= ICL 2900 Series =

UK mainframe computer systems

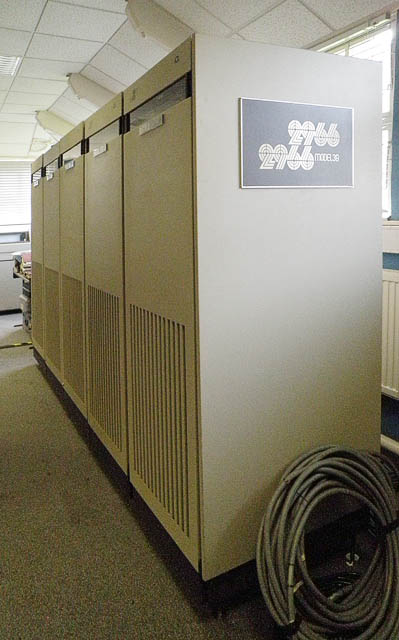
An ICL 2966 Model 39

The ICL 2900 Series was a range of mainframe computer systems announced by the British manufacturer International Computers Limited on 9 October 1974. The company had started development under the name "New Range" immediately on its formation in 1968. The range was not designed to be compatible with any previous machines produced by the company, nor for compatibility with any competitor's machines: rather, it was conceived as a synthetic option, combining the best ideas available from a variety of sources.

In marketing terms, the 2900 Series was superseded by Series 39 in the mid-1980s; however, Series 39 was essentially a new set of machines implementing the 2900 Series architecture, as were subsequent ICL machines branded "Trimetra".

== Origins ==
When ICL was formed in 1968 as a result of the merger of International Computers and Tabulators (ICT) with English Electric Leo Marconi and Elliott Automation, the company considered several options for its future product line. These included enhancements to either ICT's 1900 Series or the English Electric System 4, and a development based on J. K. Iliffe's Basic Language Machine. The option finally selected was the so-called Synthetic Option: a new design conceptualized from scratch.

As the name implies, the design was influenced by many sources, including earlier ICL machines. The design of Burroughs mainframes was influential, although ICL rejected the concept of optimising the design for one high-level language. The Multics system provided other ideas, notably in the area of protection. However, the biggest single outside influence was probably the MU5 machine developed at Manchester University.

== Architectural concepts ==
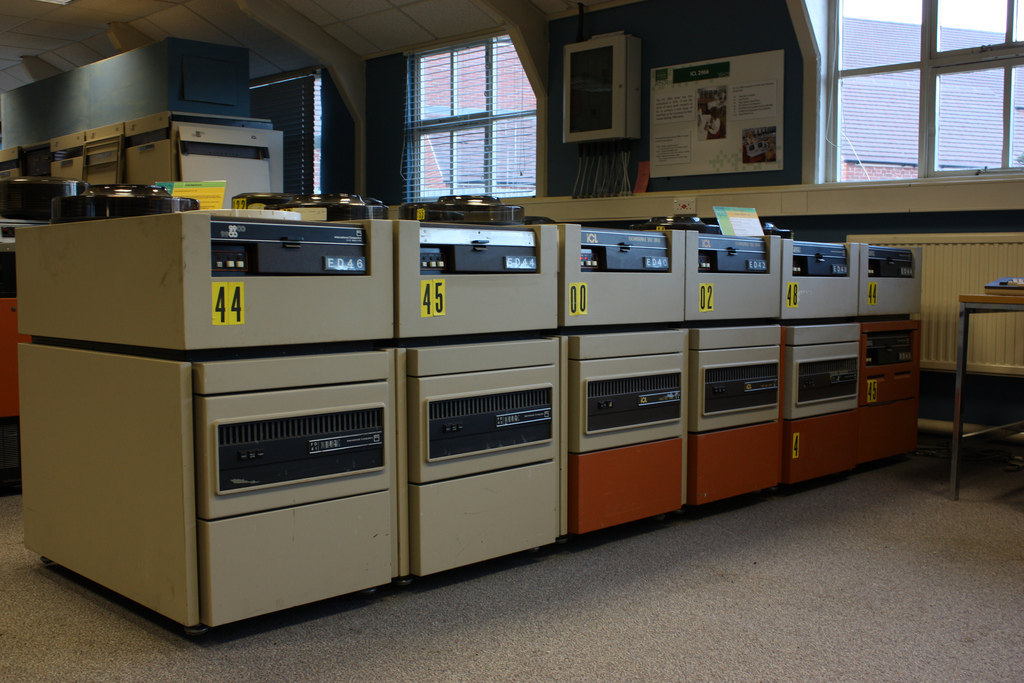
ICL 2966 disk drives

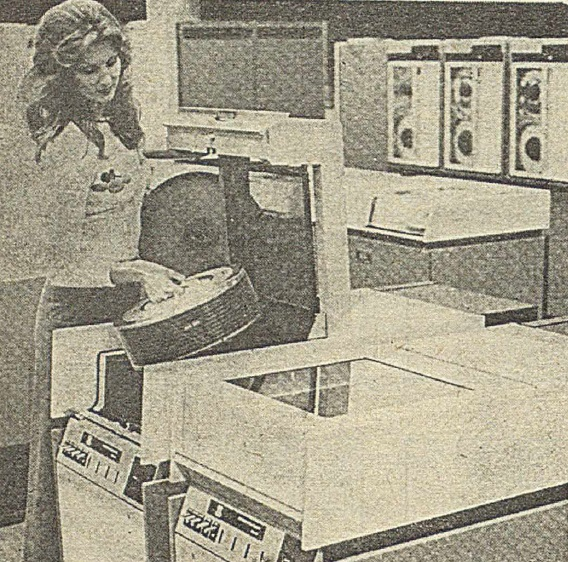
Operator loading disc pack into unit

=== The virtual machine ===
The 2900 Series architecture uses the concept of a virtual machine as the set of resources available to a program. The concept of a virtual machine in the 2900 Series architecture differs from the term as used in other environments. Because each program runs in its own virtual machine, the concept may be likened to a process in other operating systems, while the 2900 Series process is more like a thread.

The most obvious resource in a virtual machine is the virtual store (memory). Other resources include peripherals, files, and network connections.

In a virtual machine, code can run in any of sixteen layers of protection, called access levels (or ACR levels, after the Access Control Register which controls the mechanism). The most-privileged levels of operating system code (the kernel) operate in the same virtual machine as the user application, as do intermediate levels such as the subsystems that implement filestore access and networking. System calls thus involve a change of protection level, but not an expensive call to invoke code in a different virtual machine. Every code module executes at a particular access level, and can invoke the functions offered by lower-level (more privileged) code, but does not have direct access to memory or other resources at that level. The architecture thus offers a built-in encapsulation mechanism to ensure system integrity.

Segments of memory can be shared between virtual machines. There are two kinds of shared memory: public segments used by the operating system (which are present in all virtual machines), and global segments used for application-level shared data: this latter mechanism is used only when there is an application requirement for two virtual machines to communicate. For example, global memory segments are used for database lock tables. Hardware semaphore instructions are available to synchronise access to such segments. A minor curiosity is that two virtual machines sharing a global segment use different virtual addresses for the same memory locations, which means that virtual addresses cannot safely be passed from one VM to another.

The term used in the ICL 2900 Series and ICL Series 39 machines for central processing unit (CPU) is "Order Code Processor" (OCP).

=== Addressing mechanisms ===
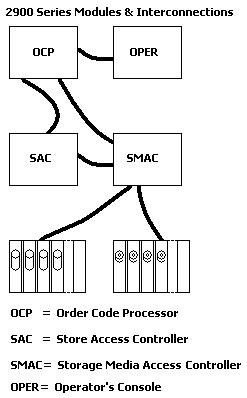

The 2900 architecture supports a hardware-based call stack, providing an efficient vehicle for executing high-level language programs, especially those allowing recursive function calls. This was a forward-looking decision at the time, because it was expected that the dominant programming languages would initially be COBOL and FORTRAN. The architecture provides built-in mechanisms for making procedure calls using the stack, and special-purpose registers for addressing the top of the stack and the base of the current stack frame.

Off-stack data is typically addressed via a descriptor. This is a 64-bit structure containing a 32-bit virtual address and 32 bits of control information. The control information identifies whether the area being addressed is code or data; in the case of data, the size of the items addressed (1, 8, 32, 64, or 128 bits); a flag to indicate whether hardware array-bound-checking is required; and various other refinements.

The 32-bit virtual address comprises a 14-bit segment number and an 18-bit displacement within the segment.

The order code is not strictly part of the 2900 architecture. This fact has been exploited to emulate other machines by microcoding their instruction sets. However, in practice, all machines in the 2900 series implement a common order code or instruction set, known as the PLI (Primitive Level Interface). This is designed primarily as a target for high-level language compilers. The most powerful machines, such as the 2980 and 2988, implemented all instructions in hardware, whereas the others used microcoded firmware.

There are several registers, each designed for a special purpose. An accumulator register (ACC) is available for general-purpose use, and may be 32, 64, or 128 bits in size. The B register is used for indexing into arrays; the LNB (Local Name Base) register points to the base of the current stack frame, with the SF (Stack Front) register pointing to the movable 'top' of the stack; the DR register is used for holding descriptors for addressing into the heap, and so on. There are also two 32-bit pointers to off-stack data; XNB (eXtra Name Base) and LTB (Linkage Table Base).

Data formats recognized by the PLI instructions include 32-bit unsigned integers; 32-bit and 64-bit twos-complement integers; 32-bit, 64-bit and 128-bit floating point; and 32-bit, 64-bit, and 128-bit packed decimal. Contrary to C and UNIX convention, the Boolean value true is represented as zero and false is represented as minus one. Strings are stored as arrays of 8-bit characters, conventionally encoded in EBCDIC (although ICL's EBCDIC has minor variations from IBM's version). It is possible to use ISO (essentially ASCII) instead of EBCDIC by setting a control bit in a privileged register; among other things, this affects certain decimal conversion instructions.

Because some of the PLI instructions, notably those for procedure calling, are very powerful (especially system calls), instruction rates on the 2900 Series are not always directly comparable with those on competitors' hardware. ICL marketing literature tended to use the concept of "IBM equivalent MIPS", being the MIPS rating of an IBM mainframe that achieved the same throughput in application benchmarks. The efficiencies achieved by the 2900 architecture, notably the avoidance of system call overheads, compensated for relatively slow raw hardware performance.

== Implementations ==
ICL 2900 range (as at 1980)
Processor	Model	Announced	Delivered	Later models
P-series
P4	2980	Oct 1974	Jun 1975	
P3	2970	Oct 1974	Dec 1974	
P2L	2960	Mar 1976	Dec 1975	
P2S	2950	Cancelled		
PI	2940	Cancelled		
P0	2930	Cancelled		
S-series
S4		Cancelled		
S3	2966	Nov 1980	Jun 1981	2955, 2958, 2977, 2988
S2	2956	Nov 1980	-	
S1	2950	Nov 1977	Jun 1978	2946

=== P (parallel) series ===
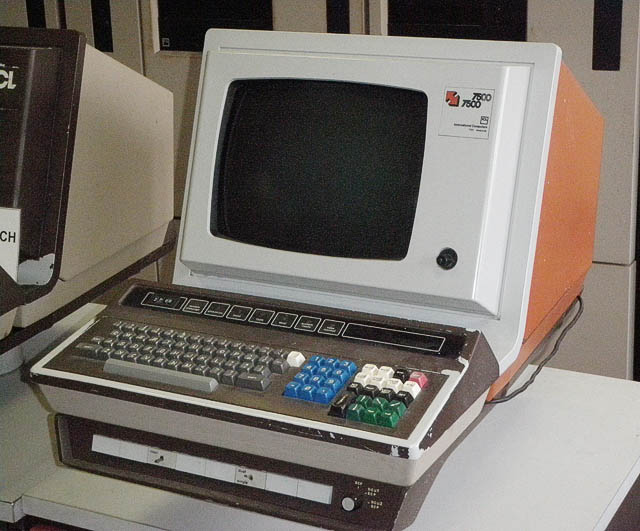
An ICL 7561 terminal, used as an operator console

The first machines announced in the 2900 Series were the 2980 and 2970. The 2980 allowed one or two order code processors (OCPs), each operating at up to 3 million instructions per second, with real memory configurable up to 8 megabytes, with a 500-nanosecond access time.

The 2980 was initially the most powerful of ICL's New Range mainframe computers. In addition to the OCPs, it consisted of a store multiple access controller (SMAC) and one or more store access controllers (SAC), a general peripheral controller (GPC), one or more disc file controllers (DFC) and a communications link controller (CLC), together with disc drives (a typical configuration would have eight EDS 200 drives), tape decks, an operating station (OPER), line printers, and card readers. It could run the ICL VME (VME/B, VME/K) or the Edinburgh Multiple Access System (EMAS) operating system. A typical 2980 configuration would cost about £2 million (equivalent to £12 million in 2025).

Unlike the 2980, the 2970 and the subsequent 2960 were microcoded, and thus allowed emulation of instruction sets such as that of the older 1900 Series or the System 4.

A 2900 Series machine was constructed from a number of functional modules, each contained in a separate cabinet. Peripheral devices were connected using ICL's Primitive Interface (Socket/Plug and cable set) to a Port Adapter on the SMAC. Logical addressing was employed and used a group scheme to identify system components in terms of Ports, Trunks, and Streams.

A Trunk was a generic name and a hardware address within a Port to which a peripheral controller would be assigned. A Trunk was a generic name for a controller for a number of Stream devices. A Stream was the generic name for the channel under which individual peripheral devices could be referenced.

The boot process for the 2960 Series merits special mention: the OCP contained a mini OPER terminal and a cassette deck. At boot, the OCP would perform its Initial Program Load (IPL) from the nominated IPL device. The IPL code provided the means for the OCP to discover the system's hardware configuration by enquiring down the Stream(s), Trunk(s), and Port(s) to find the default or manually elected boot device for the microcode set and/or Operating System to be booted. This process was called a GROPE or General Reconnaissance Of Peripheral Equipment. The cassette load method also allowed engineering staff to load and execute diagnostic software.

=== S (serial) series ===
The first machines were subsequently replaced by a family of machines based on the 2966 mid-range design, which was less costly to build and used serial rather than parallel interconnections. The 2966 was extended upward in performance to the 2988 and downward to the 2958, augmented by dual processor versions, to cover the entire performance range.

== See also ==
- VME - the operating system for the ICL 2900 Series, not to be confused with a (later) embedded operating system.
- Edinburgh Multiple Access System - non-ICL operating system for the ICL 2900 series (and other machines)
- Content Addressable File Store (CAFS)
- ICL Distributed Array Processor (DAP)

== Sources ==
- The ICL 2900 Series. J. K. Buckle. Macmillan Computer Science Series, 1978. ISBN 0-333-21917-1.
- An Outline of the ICL 2900 Series System Architecture. J. L. Keedy. In Computer Structures: Principles and Examples, ed Daniel P. Siewiorek, C. Gordon Bell, and Allen Newell. Originally published in Australian Computer Journal, vol. 9, no. 2, July 1977, pp. 53–62. Available online
