= Costley =

Costley is a surname. Notable people with the surname include:

- David Costley (1837–1923), Canadian bear hunter
- Edward Costley (1794–1883), New Zealand philanthropist
- James Costley (1862–1931), English footballer
- Madeline Costley, fictional character on the Fox TV series Dollhouse
