= Edinburgh Multiple Access System =

Mainframe computer operating system

Edinburgh Multiple Access System (EMAS)
- Developer: University of Edinburgh, University of Kent
- Written in: Edinburgh IMP
- Initial release: 1971; 55 years ago
- Marketing target: Mainframe computers
- Supported platforms: ICL System 4/75, ICL 2900 series of mainframes, Amdahl 470 mainframe clone, IBM System/370-XA architecture, National Advanced System (NAS) VL80 IBM mainframe clone
- Default user interface: basic command interpreter

The Edinburgh Multi-Access System (EMAS) was a mainframe computer operating system at the University of Edinburgh. The system went online in 1971.

EMAS was a powerful and efficient general purpose multi-user system which coped with many of the computing needs of the University of Edinburgh and the University of Kent (the only other site outside Edinburgh to adopt the operating system).

== History ==
Originally running on the ICL System 4/75 mainframe (based on the design of the IBM 360) it was later reimplemented on the ICL 2900 series of mainframes (as EMAS 2900 or EMAS-2) where it ran in service until the mid-1980s. Near the end of its life, the refactored version was back-ported (as EMAS-3) to the Amdahl 470 mainframe clone, and thence to the IBM System/370-XA architecture (the latter with help from the University of Kent, although they never actually ran EMAS-3). The National Advanced System (NAS) VL80 IBM mainframe clone followed later. The final EMAS system (the Edinburgh VL80) was decommissioned in July 1992.

The University of Kent system went live in December 1979, and ran on the least powerful machine in the ICL 2900 range - an ICL 2960, with 2 MB of memory, executing about 290k instructions per second. Despite this, it reliably supported around 30 users. This number increased in 1983 with the addition of an additional 2 MB of memory and a second Order Code Processor (OCP) (what is normally known as a CPU) running with symmetric multiprocessing. This system was decommissioned in August 1986.

== Features ==
EMAS was written entirely in the Edinburgh IMP programming language, with only a small number of critical functions using embedded assembler within IMP sources. It had several features that were advanced for the time, including dynamic linking, multi-level storage, an efficient scheduler, a separate user-space kernel ('director'), a user-level shell ('basic command interpreter'), a comprehensive archiving system and a memory-mapped file architecture.

Such features led EMAS supporters to claim that their system was superior to Unix for the first 20 years of the latter's existence.

== Legacy ==
The Edinburgh Computer History Project is attempting to salvage some of the lessons learned from the EMAS project and has the complete source code of EMAS online for public browsing.

== See also ==
- Atlas Autocode
