= ICL Series 39 =

Computer series from British company ICL

The ICL Series 39 was a range of mainframe and minicomputer computer systems released by the UK manufacturer ICL in 1985. The original Series 39 introduced the "S3L" (whose corrupt pronunciation resulted in the name "Estriel") processors and microcodes, and a nodal architecture, which is a form of Non-Uniform Memory Access.

== Origins ==
The Series 39 range was based upon the New Range concept and the VME operating system from the company's ICL 2900 line, and was introduced as two ranges:

- Series 39 "Estriel" systems (Series 39 Level 40 and above, including multinodes), which replaced previous mid-range and large processors from the 2900 range, and needed a full computer room environment
- Series 39 DM1 systems (up to Series 39 Level 30), which were intended to replace the smaller processors such as the ICT1901/2, the ICL2903/4 and the ME29 ranges. These brought mainframe class operating system facilities into the office environment, a first for ICL.

== Design ==
The original Series 39 introduced the "S3L" processors and microcodes, and a nodal architecture (see ICL VME) which is a form of Non-Uniform Memory Access which allowed nodes to be up to 1,000 metres (3,300 ft) apart.

The Series 39 range introduced Nodal Architecture, a novel implementation of distributed shared memory that can be seen as a hybrid of a multiprocessor system and a cluster design. Each machine consists of a number of nodes, and each node contains its own order-code processor and main memory. Virtual machines are typically located (at any one time) on one node, but have the capability to run on any node and to be relocated from one node to another. Discs and other peripherals are shared between nodes. Nodes are connected using a high-speed optical bus (Macrolan) using multiple fibre optic cables, which is used to provide applications with a virtual shared memory. Memory segments that are marked as shared (public or global segments) are replicated to each node, with updates being broadcast over the inter-node network. Processes which use unshared memory segments (nodal or local) run in complete isolation from other nodes and processes.

The semaphore instructions prove their worth by controlling access to the shared writable memory segments while allowing the contents to be moved around efficiently.

Overall, a well configured Series 39 with VME had an architecture which can provide a significant degree of proofing against disasters, a nod to the abortive VME/T ideas of the previous decade.

All Series 39 machines were supported by a set of waist height peripheral 'Cabinets' (connected via fibre optic cables via one or more Multi Port Switch Units or MPSU's) providing disk storage capabilities:-

- Cabinet 2 - these were the main Disk Storage Cabinets holding a pair of 330Mb 8-inch "Swallow" Hard Drives
- Cabinet 3 - these were an expansion cabinet to the Cabinet 2 and could hold up to four more 330Mb 8-inch "Swallow" Hard Drives
- Cabinet 4 - these were a bridge cabinet would was used to connect Series 39 to older 2900 Diskpack based Storage (such as EDS200's)

Cabinet 1 was the name given to the DM1 Series 39 Level 30 (and 20/15/25/35 variants) core system.

All Series 39 machines also featured a Node Support Computer (NSC) hosted on their Storage Motherboards - this was x86 architecture and acted much like today's ILO or DRAC cards on HP/Dell Servers and allowed Support Staff to manage the Nodes remotely including the ability to completely stop and restart the main Nodes.

== Evolution ==
In the mid-1980s the Series 39 Level 30 was supplemented by a Level 20 variant which was a forcibly underclocked Level 30 (using wire links on a daughterboard). In the late 80s these were both replaced by Level 15, 25 and 35 variants which also carried various levels of clocking state but featured more memory than their predecessors and could also be fitted with Dual OCP and IOC motherboards for even more computing and I/O capability.

The early 1990s saw upgrades to the Series 39 range. DX System products were introduced to replace the DM1 systems, appearing in product line-ups already in late 1991. The Essex project led to the introduction of the SX System products in 1990 to replace the Estriel ("S3L") systems. These machines featured a new "very sophisticated pipelined processor" design that provided support for the ICL 2900 order code by employing a low-level "implementation order code" known as Picode. Picode is comparable to microcode but operates at much higher level than microcode from earlier machines and at a slightly lower level than ICL 2900 instructions, operating within similar constraints to those applying to conventional machine instructions. Picode instruction sequences are fed into instruction pipelines and provide atomic results, being uninterruptable.

== Replacement ==
The Series 39 SX and DX products were replaced by the SY and DY products respectively, these comprising the Trimetra range along with LY products. The SY node architecture abandoned ECL in favour of CMOS technology, introduced support for symmetric multiprocessing involving up to four instruction processors per node, refined the instruction processing architecture, and provided cheaper multi-node connectivity.

In contrast, the Trimetra DY system sought to use commodity hardware to provide OpenVME support through the use of emulation techniques. ICL's Millennium vision, as realised by Trimetra, entailed the provision of OpenVME in the form of an OpenVME Subsystem (OVS) alongside Microsoft Windows NT or SCO UnixWare running in a UnixWare/NT Subsystem (UNS). Whereas Trimetra SY and LY (a reduced footprint product based on SY) employed dedicated hardware to provide OVS functionality, alongside a Fujitsu-supplied Intel processor module providing UNS functionality, Trimetra DY offered an approach that supported either OVS or UNS functionality running entirely on an Intel processor system. To provide OVS, an emulator for the SY instruction set, together with input/output functionality and a platform abstraction layer, were deployed on the VxWorks operating system.

With ICL having identified markets seeking higher-performance Unix or NT systems without a need for OpenVME compatibility, introducing the Trimetra Xtraserver product featuring from four to twelve 200 MHz Pentium Pro processors, Trimetra in turn was replaced by Fujitsu's mainframe platform, Nova, providing the Trimetra architecture on generic Unisys ES7000 Intel-based server hardware.

Nova itself was phased out in 2007 and replaced with SuperNova, which runs OpenVME on top of Windows Server or Linux, using as few as two CPUs on generic Wintel server hardware.

The transition of the "ICL mainframe" to a pure software product was thus complete, enabling Fujitsu to concentrate on VME support and development without having to keep up with hardware technology.
