= English Electric System 4 =

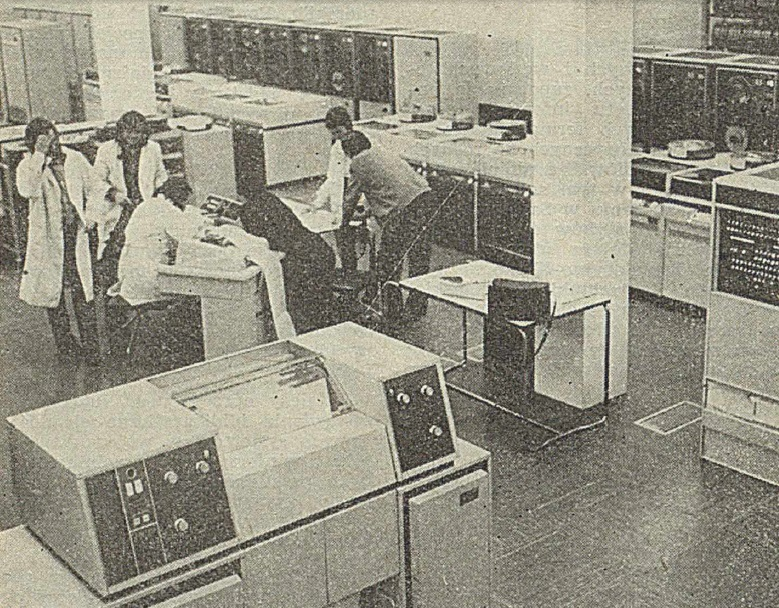
ICL System 4 system in 1975

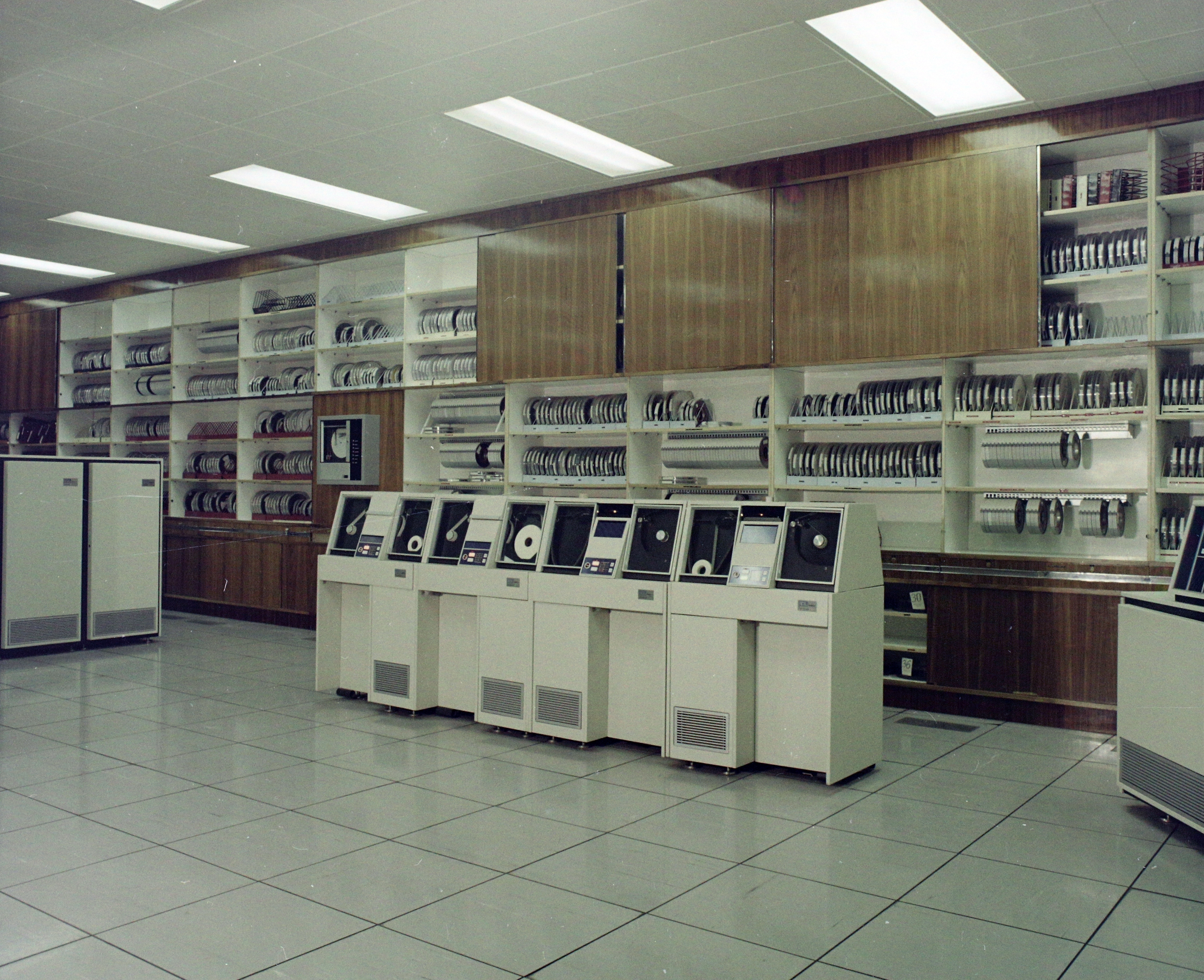
ICL System 4 system magnetic tape area

The English Electric (later ICL) System 4 was a mainframe computer announced in 1965. It was derived from the RCA Spectra 70 range, itself a variant of the IBM System 360 architecture.

The models in the range included the System 4-10 (cancelled), 4-30 (1967), 4-50 (1967, practically the same as the RCA 70/45), 4-70 (1968, designed by English Electric) and 4-75. ICL documentation also mentions a model 4-40. This was a slugged version of the 4-50, introduced when the 4-30 (intended to be the volume seller) was found to be underpowered and had to be withdrawn. The 4-10 was introduced as a satellite computer, but demand was very low, so it was withdrawn. Only the 4-50 and 4-70, and their successors, the 4-52 and 4-72, sold in any numbers. A slugged 4-72 (the 4-62) was introduced for sale in Eastern Europe.

The System 4-50 and 4-70 were intended for real-time applications, for they had four processor states, each with its own set of general-purpose registers (GPR). Although some states did not have all 16 GPRs, nevertheless, the design avoided having to save registers when switching between processor states. At the lowest level (P1) was the user state. The instructions available in this state were the non-privileged instructions of the IBM System 360. Intermediate levels dealt with various hardware interrupts. State P2 was the Interrupt Response State which performed tasks determined by the Interrupt Control State P3 (the next-highest processor state). The highest state, P4, was the emergency state, initiated in the event of a power failure or a machine check. In the case of power failure, the processor saved the volatile registers before shutting itself down in an orderly fashion. This task was completed within one millisecond from the onset of power failure and removal of power from the machine. For a machine check, an indication of the failure was given to the operator.

In processor states P1 and P2, 16 GPRs were available; in State P3, 6 GPRs were available, while in State P4, 5 GPRs were available. An interrupt status register and interrupt mask register were provided in each of the four processor states. The one set of floating-point registers was available to all processor states.

Instruction times (microseconds) were as follows:

                 4-50      4-70
Add      AR      5.28      1.1
         A       8.88      2.1
Multiply MR     62.52      5.8
         M      65.64      6.6
Divide   DR     90.81     10.8
         D      94.89     11.6
Floating-point instructions
Add      AE     19.2       3.6
         AD     27.69      4.0
Multiply ME     49.42      6.2
         MD    186.55     11.5
Divide   DE     83.0       9.3
         DD    280.27     18.6
Halve    HER     6.00      1.1 
         HDR     8.16      1.8

The System 4 could be supplied with medium-speed or high-speed card readers. 80-column cards were read at 800 cards per minute, or at up to 1,435 cards per minute, depending on the model. 51-column cards were read at 1,170 or 1,820 cards per minute, again depending on the model. The high speed reader took the cards end-wise.

Other peripheral devices available for the System 4 include: high-speed paper tape reader (1,500 characters/second) from 5, 7, or 8 channels; paper tape output punch (150 characters/second at any of the three tape widths given before); 80-column card punch (100 cards / minute); a magnetic tape controller with up to 8 magnetic tape units attached. Tape speeds for model 4453: 150 inches/second; models 4452 and 4450: 75 inches/second; and model 4454: 37.5 inches per second. Model 4454 was 7-track; the other models were 9-track. Removable magnetic discs were available: on Models 10 and 30, 203 cylinders, 10 surfaces per cylinder, with 2,888 bytes per track. Transfer rate was 156K bytes/second. Disc Drive Model 4425 provided 3781 data bytes per track, maximum disc capacity was 7,378,000 bytes.

A variety of medium and high-speed drum printers could be supplied. Medium-speed printers printed at about 600 lines per minute using all available characters. The high-speed printers delivered 1080 lines per minute or 1000 lines per minute (depending on the model), printing all 64 characters per line with excellent print quality. A later model delivered up to 1150 lines per minute. When fitted with a drum having a 16-character set, the printing speed was 2,700 lines per minute.

The operating system was multi-programming with a variable number of tasks. In the field, the system did not perform well on account of input data being stored on disc as 80-byte records, and output as 160-byte records. In about 1971, the then supplier, ICL, rewrote I/O modules to remove trailing blanks on input and output, and to block to 384 bytes, which improved performance considerably.

The non-privileged instruction set of the System 4-50 and 4-70 included the integer, floating-point, character, and decimal instructions—in short, the full non-privileged instruction set of the IBM System 360, except for Test and Set (TS). The ICL System 4-30 included the half-word instructions, LH, AH, SH, MH, and divide halfword (DH), etc., but not the fullword instructions L, A, etc.

System 4 proved itself to have very efficient communications and was the basis for several successful real-time processing applications. The System 4-75 was introduced in an attempt to cover the real-time/time-sharing market, but few were sold. One System 4-75 was used at the ERCC to develop the EMAS interactive operating system. Another was used by the English Electric Computer Bureau subsidiary to develop and run the internally developed Interact 75 suite of time-sharing commercial packages for payroll and financial ledgers, but this proved unsuccessful, and the project was soon closed.
