= International Computers Limited =

British computer company (1968-2002)

- Logo c. 1988
- Type: Private
- Industry: Computer hardware, computer software
- Founded: 1968
- Defunct: 2002
- Fate: Acquired
- Successor: Fujitsu, Zensar
- Headquarters: London, England
- Services: Computer services
- Number of employees: 33,000 (1980), 20,000 (1985)

International Computers Limited (ICL) was a British computer hardware, computer software and computer services company that operated from 1968 until 2002. It was formed through a merger of International Computers and Tabulators (ICT), English Electric Computers (EEC) and Elliott Automation in 1968. The company's most successful product line was the ICL 2900 Series range of mainframe computers.

In later years, ICL diversified its product line but the bulk of its profits always came from its mainframe customers. New ventures included marketing a range of powerful IBM clones made by Fujitsu, various minicomputer and personal computer ranges and (more successfully) a range of retail point-of-sale equipment and back-office software. Although it had significant sales overseas, ICL's mainframe business was dominated by large contracts from the UK public sector, including Post Office Ltd, the Inland Revenue, the Department for Work and Pensions and the Ministry of Defence. It also had a strong market share with UK local authorities and (at that time) nationalised utilities including the water, electricity, and gas boards.

The company had an increasingly close relationship with Fujitsu from the early 1980s, culminating in Fujitsu becoming sole shareholder in 1998. ICL was rebranded as Fujitsu in April 2002. Fujitsu (UK) as the hardware and software supplier has been implicated in the British Post Office scandal, which has extended from the 1990s to the 2020s. The ICL brand is still used by the former Russian joint-venture of the company, founded in 1991.

== Origins ==
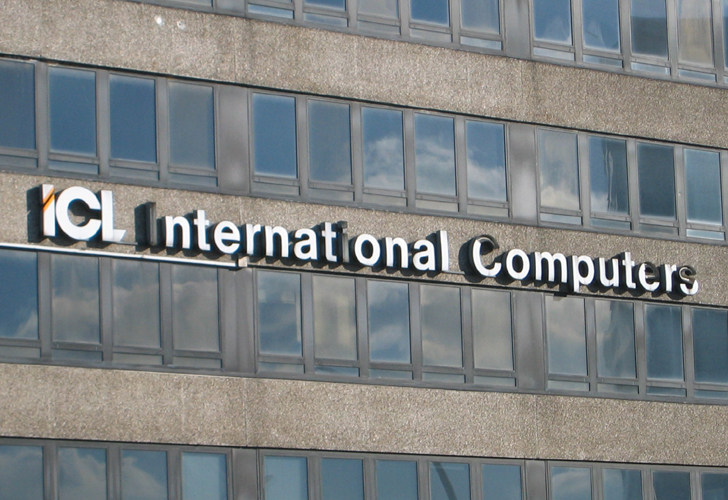
Former ICL offices at Amsinckstraße 45, Hamburg, Germany. In 2013 the building was converted into a hotel.

International Computers Limited was formed in 1968 as a part of the Industrial Expansion Act of the Wilson Labour government. ICL was an initiative of Tony Benn, the Minister of Technology, to create a British computer industry that could compete with major world manufacturers like IBM; the formation of the company was the last in a series of mergers that had taken place in the industry since the late 1950s.

The main portions of ICL were formed by merging International Computers and Tabulators (ICT) with English Electric Computers, the latter a recent merger of Elliott Automation with English Electric Leo Marconi computers, which itself had been a merger of the computer divisions of English Electric, LEO and Marconi. Upon its creation, the British government held a 10% stake in the company and provided a $32.4 million research-and-development grant spread across four years.

=== International Computers and Tabulators (ICT) ===
ICT was itself the result of a merger of two UK companies that had competed with each other throughout the 1930s and 1940s during the punched card era: British Tabulating Machine Company (BTM) and Powers-Samas. ICT had thus emerged with equipment that would process data encoded on punched cards with 40, 80 or 160 columns, compared to the 64 or 80 columns used by IBM and its predecessors.

In 1962, ICT delivered the first ICT 1300 series computer, its first transistor machine and also the first to use core memory. A small team from Ferranti's Canadian subsidiary, Ferranti-Packard, visited the various Ferranti computer labs and saw their work on a next-generation machine. On their return home they quickly produced the Ferranti-Packard 6000, developing the machine, compilers and an operating system (before these were common) and putting it on the market by 1963. A feature of the Executive operating system was its ability to multitask, using dynamic memory allocation enabled with a magnetic drum as an intermediate random access device. The machine went on to have some success and sold in small numbers in Canada (Saskatchewan Power Corporation retired serial number 0004 in early 1982) and the United States.

In 1964, ICT purchased the computer division of Ferranti via a government-mandated transaction. Ferranti had been building a small number of scientific machines based on various university designs since the 1950s. None of these could be considered commercially successful, however, and Ferranti always seemed to be slow bringing its designs to market.

Meanwhile, ICT management in England was looking to rejuvenate their line-up; their latest ideas, which had gone into the FP 6000 in Canada, were still not on the market. Management looked at the FP 6000 as well as licensing the RCA Spectra 70. In the end, it was decided to go with the FP 6000 as the basis for a small line of small-to-midrange machines. The result was the ICT 1900 series, which would eventually sell into the thousands and compete in the UK with the IBM System/360 range from the mid-1960s to the mid-1970s. The design was based on a 24-bit word, divided up into 6-bit characters; lower case and control characters were provided for by "shift" characters. The early machines (1904/1905 with hardware floating point) had only 15-bit addressing, but later machines (1904E, 1905E, 1906A) had extended addressing modes, up to 22 bits.

The operating systems (Executives) were:

- E4BM – the original for the FP 6000 (known internally as the FP1)
- E4RM – a significantly rewritten version of E4BM, with parts of the operating system overlaid to save space
- E6BM – a rewritten version of E4BM for the later machines with 22 bit addressing
- E6RM – a rewritten version of E4RM overlay software for the later machines with 22 bit addressing

A later development was GEORGE3, remembered with great affection by a generation of British programmers.

A series of smaller machines were developed by the ICL Stevenage operation, consisting initially of the 1901 / 1902 / 1903 systems running E3 series executives (e.g. E3RM) and versions of the GEORGE operating system (initially GEORGE1). Later developments were the 1901A / 1902A / 1903A with their own Executives and GEORGE2.

In contrast to many computers of the 1960s and 1970s, such as IBM/360 series, where programs had to be recompiled to run in different machine and/or operating system environments, one significant feature of the 1900 series was that programs would function unaltered on any 1900 system, without the need for recompilation.

=== English Electric LEO Marconi (EELM) ===
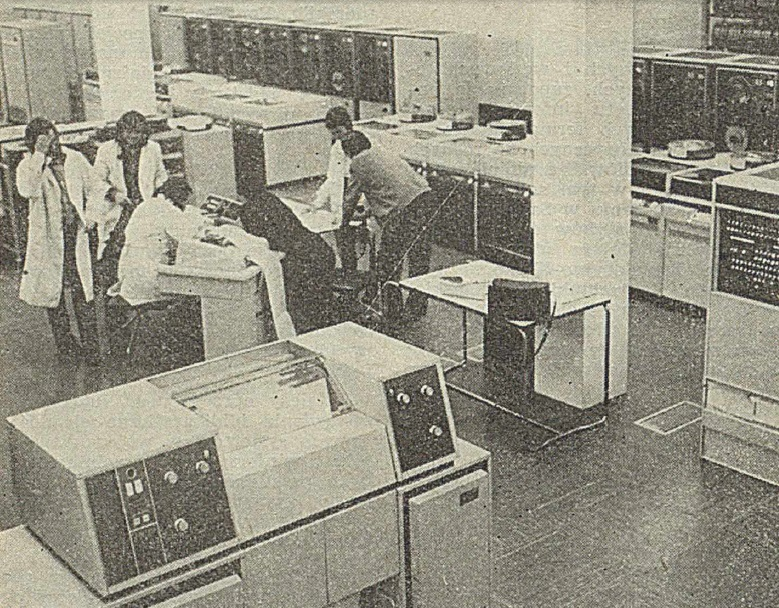
A System 4 system in 1975

During the same period, LEO was struggling to produce its own machines that would be able to compete with IBM. Its parent company, J. Lyons and Co., did not have the financial might to develop a new line of machines. Not wanting to see its work go to waste, it sold its computer division to English Electric. That company had developed a series of machines over the years, notably the KDF9 and the commercially oriented KDF8.

Having secured considerable financial backing, the new company nevertheless decided not to produce its own design, and instead licensed the RCA Spectra 70 (the design ICT rejected); this arrangement resulted in the System 4 series. While there were a number of models in the range, the smaller 4/10 and 4/30 were seen as underpowered, and the more successful variants were the larger 4/50 and 4/70 models. A model 4/75 was supplied to the EELM (later Baric) Bureau subsidiary and installed at Winsford, Cheshire for interactive use by bureau customers. Although several multi-user commercial packages (e.g. sales and purchase ledger systems) were developed and tried with customers, this was not commercially successful, and the service was soon withdrawn.

The System 4 series ran the J (for Job) operating system. This was a batch operating system, although there was a variant that allowed interactive access called MultiJob. Under a framework called Driver, J was a successful operating environment for high-volume commercial real-time systems. The programming languages were assembler, COBOL and Fortran (an Algol 60 compiler was provided but not used much, if at all). The system was controlled from a console composed of a mechanical printer and keyboard – very like a Teletype. The assembly language (known as Usercode) non-privileged instruction set was identical to IBM System 360 Assembly Language; in privileged mode there were a few extras.

System 4's compatibility with the IBM 360 made it particularly attractive to customers in Eastern Europe and the Soviet Union, as the sale and installation of IBM computers (and other American technologies) there was politically sensitive and commercially restricted during the Cold War.

=== Leo computers ===
- LEO computer Leo 3 – origins in J. Lyons and Co.

=== Elliott Automation computers ===
- Elliott 4100 – a joint development with NCR Corporation. Transferred to ICL but sales and development ended soon after the formation of ICL.

The following remained with Elliott Automation and were never included in the formation of ICL:

- Elliott 503 – extensively used for academic and scientific work in British universities
- Elliott 803
- Elliott 901 / 920A
- Elliott 903 / 920B
- Elliott 905 / 920C
- Elliott 920ATC

The 900 series were 18 bit binary computers. The 90x series were commercial machines. The 920x series were built to military specifications and used in military aircraft, mobile field deployed air defence systems and tanks.

== Locations ==
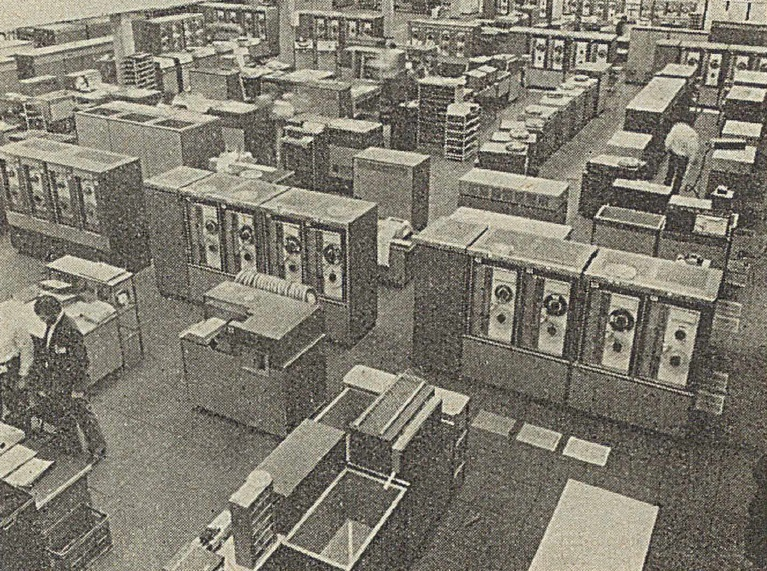
Part of the computer hall at Bracknell in 1977

ICL was concentrated in the United Kingdom, with its corporate headquarters in Putney in the London borough of Wandsworth.

At the time of the original merger, the company inherited extensive engineering and manufacturing facilities in West Gorton, Manchester; Castlereagh in Belfast, Stevenage and Croydon from ICT, and from English Electric in Kidsgrove, Staffordshire and Winsford, Cheshire. Manufacture and assembly also took place at several factories in Letchworth Garden City (the original home of the British Tabulating Company) and Croydon.

The company had a large research, operating system and software development and support centre in Bracknell, another smaller one at Dalkeith in Scotland and a software development centre in Adelaide, South Australia, between 1970 and 1973, application development in Reading, and training centres at Moor Hall (Cookham), Beaumont College (Old Windsor) (sales, support and software) and Letchworth (Hertfordshire) (manufacturing & field engineering).

The company also had manufacturing facilities in Park Road Mill, Dukinfield; later replaced by a purpose-built factory at Ashton-under-Lyne.Ashton under-Lyne's team was noted for working on numerous mechanical innovations in the field of computer engineering. A state of the art printed circuit board plant was built in Plymouth Grove, Manchester in 1979, however financial troubles within the company forced its closure in 1981. Other offices included a facility at Bridgford House in Nottingham which was the headquarters of Rushcliffe Borough Council, but has since been converted into apartments.

For some years ICL maintained a training and presentation facility for senior management at Hedsor House, near Taplow, Berkshire.

Outside the UK, ICL's offices around the world were mainly sales and marketing operations, with some application development for the local market. The exceptions were development and manufacturing sites arising from acquisitions, such as Utica, New York in the United States from the Singer merger, and a variety of former Nokia Data sites in Sweden and Finland.

ICL and its customers often referred to these locations by the Site Code, especially where multiple sites might exist in a town, for instance with the Putney headquarters building (now Putney Wharf Tower) being LON11 (London 11), the training college at Beaumont being WSR01 (Windsor 01) and the southern System Support Centre (SCC) at Bracknell, Berkshire being BRA01 (Bracknell 01). BRA05 was the new headquarters of ICL (UK) Ltd, the company's UK sales and customer service division which moved from its original base at Putney Bridge House (LON13) in Fulham, London to a new building in Bracknell in the late 1980s.

== Early products: 1900 Series and System 4 ==
On its formation, the company inherited two main product lines: from ICT the 1900 Series of mainframes, and from English Electric Computers (EEC) the System 4, a range of IBM System/360-compatible mainframe clones, based on the RCA Spectra 70.

As of 1971, the United Kingdom was unusual in Europe for IBM not having more than 50% of the computer market, although an observer stated that the company constrained the size of its British subsidiary to keep ICL alive. Although still the largest European computer company, in 1971 ICL had a poor reputation. When the companies were first merged the EEC order books were full, while ICT (which had twice as many employees) was struggling, perhaps because it was already obvious that the 1900 series was incompatible with the rest of the industry, with an architecture based on a 24-bit word and 6-bit character rather than the 8-bit byte that was becoming the industry norm.

The new board decided that the 1900 should be phased out in favour of the System 4, but shortly afterwards reversed their decision. It is probable that this was due to union and political pressure from the Wilson government. In any event, most of the original EEC board resigned over the interference as they believed that the 1900 series was doomed from the outset, being incompatible with the rest of the marketplace. ICL initially thrived, but relied almost wholly on supplying the UK public sector with computers. The 1900s were sold in several countries worldwide, but the largest slice of the market was always in the UK, and the largest part of that in government, local authorities, universities, and nationalised industries.

Until the 1970s launch of the 2900 Series, the UK government had a single-tender preferential purchase agreement wherever ICL could meet the requirements.

== New range: 2900 Series ==
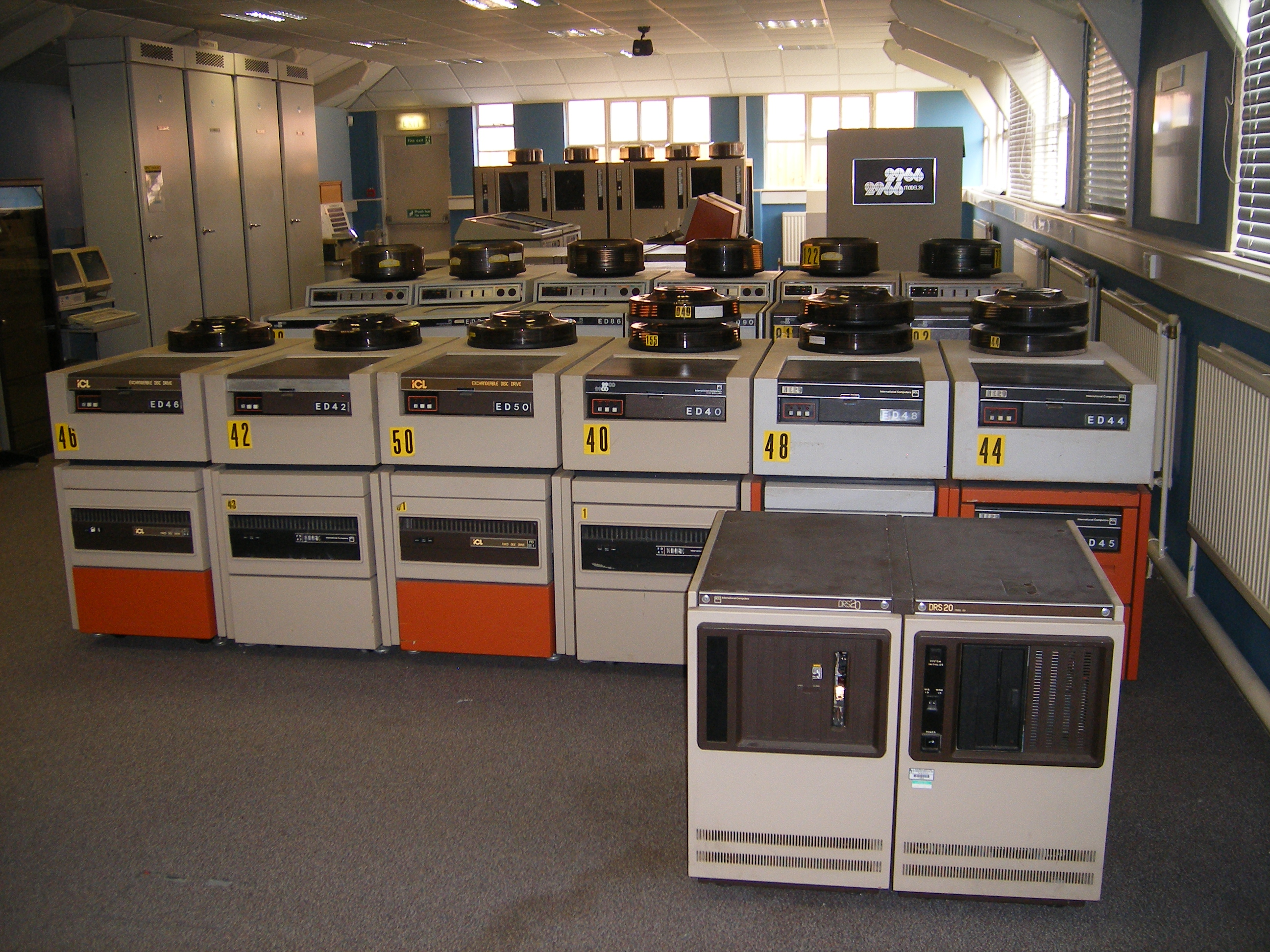
ICL 2966 at the National Museum of Computing

Even before the merger that created ICL was complete, a working party had recommended that the new company should develop a new range of machines offering "acceptable compatibility with the current ranges of both companies". This was also seen as a way to help "achieve company unity" for the newly formed organization. The resulting 2900 Series was launched on 9 October 1974. Its design drew on many sources, one being the Manchester University MU5.

It ran the VME operating systems, and supported emulation of both the earlier architectures (1900 Series and System 4), either standalone (DME, Direct Machine Environment) or concurrently with native-mode operation (CME, Concurrent Machine Environment). In the early 1980s, ICL struck a deal to acquire semiconductor technology from Fujitsu.

The term "New Range" was used during development for the product line that was eventually launched as the 2900 Series, the operating system being known initially as VME/B and later simply as VME. Models included:

- 2950
- 2955
- 2956
- 2960
- 2966
- 2970
- 2972
- 2976
- 2980
- 2982
- 2988

These ran the VME and DME (emulation) operating systems, and were available in both single and multi-processor configurations, the later being known as Duals and SuperDuals (2966 and 2988 only). The company also developed:

- A Content Addressable File Store (CAFS) that could be exploited by the VME file system and ICL 2900 IDMS
- The world's first commercially available massively parallel computer, the Distributed Array Processor (DAP), that first ran as an attached processor to the ICL 2980.

=== Series 39 ===
Series 39 followed the same essential architecture as 2900 series, but was a dramatic step forward in hardware technology. It was the first commercial mainframe to exploit optical fibres for central interconnect, and also introduced a multi-CPU (multinode) architecture transparent to the applications.

The series included:

- Level 30
- Level 50
- Level 60
- Level 80

The training video for the Series 39 featured the comedy duo Hugh Laurie and Stephen Fry.

ICL received the Queen's Award for Technological Achievement for the Series 39 in 1988.

=== Operating systems ===
At the inception of New Range development, two operating systems were planned: System B for the large processors, and System D for the mid-range. System B was subsequently renamed VME/B. A third operating system, System T, was subsequently targeted at small machines. System D was dropped in order to focus efforts on VME/B and System T, renamed to VME/K the K stood for developed in Kidsgrove, whilst VME/B Bracknell.) The first large machines (the 2980 and 2970) were launched with VME/B. VME/K first saw service on the 2960.

The chief architect of VME/B was Brian Warboys, who subsequently became professor of software engineering at the University of Manchester. VME/B was developed using the pioneering software engineering system CADES as the development environment. The architect of CADES was David Pearson (computer scientist).

VME/K development continued independently for several reasons. Early VME/B customers suffered significant performance and reliability problems, and the existence of an alternative product provided a safety net. Perhaps more significantly, VME/K was the brainchild of Ed Mack, who had been brought in by managing director Geoff Cross as ICL's head of research and development. Despite his wide responsibilities, Mack took a detailed personal interest in every aspect of VME/K design. To quote historian Martin Campbell-Kelly, "Mack had a good deal more autonomy than was good for the company." Not only was too much resource going into VME/K at the expense of the VME/B system that ICL's biggest customers were actually using, but the development of mainframe systems was also diverting expenditure from small business systems such as the 2903, whose sales were growing much more rapidly.

ICL's finances deteriorated during the late 1970s, leading to the appointment of a new management team led by Robb Wilmot and Peter Bonfield. One of their first actions was to end VME/K development. This happened just at the time that VME/K had finally reached a level of performance and reliability that made it saleable; however, the customer base was very small, and by this time VME/B (which was renamed VME 2900) had also matured sufficiently to give confidence that it would meet the future requirements for the entire mainframe range.

VME 2900 subsequently became simply VME and then Open VME, and continued to evolve. In 1980 it was marketed as "Your system for the 80s", and indeed that decade proved to be its heyday. It continued to give service to many loyal and demanding users, but has attracted few new users since 1990 or so.

==== Superstructure software ====
ICL used the term superstructure to refer to the compilers, data management tools, and transaction processing software sitting above the operating system but below the user application – a category now often labelled middleware.

IDMS(X)	Integrated Database Management System – a Codasyl database, ported and extended from the IDMS system developed by Cullinane (later Cullinet).
TPMS(X)	Transaction Processing Management System – a transaction processing monitor
DDS (X)	Data Dictionary System
QuickBuild	A package of tools for building applications for Series 39 mainframes built around the Data Dictionary System (DDS).
Querymaster	An interactive command-based query language for IDMS databases and indexed-sequential files, offering a relational view of the underlying data sources. Querymaster was based on a PhD research project undertaken by Andrew Hutt of ICL during a secondment to Southampton University in 1976.

==== Languages ====
PLAN	The assembly language for the ICL 1900 series and short for Programming LAnguage Nineteen-hundred or Programming LAnguage of the Nineteen hundred.
S3	a system programming language derived from ALGOL 68, but with data types and operators aligned to those offered by the 2900 Primitive Level Interface (that is, the order code). This was used to write the VME/B operating system and much of the superstructure, such as compilers and utilities. S3 was not generally used for application-level programming.
SCL	System Control Language, VME's equivalent of a job control or shell scripting language
ALGOL 60	There were two VME ALGOL 60 compilers. One was developed in-house in Kidsgrove while the other was ported to VME from the Edinburgh Multiple Access System by its author, Peter Stevens.
ALGOL 68	The VME ALGOL 68 compiler was written at Oxford University Computing Services and the University of Bath using the Royal Signals and Radar Establishment ALGOL 68RS portable front-end.
COBOL	for most business applications. COmmon Business Oriented Language. Used English-like expressions as instructions.
Fortran	FORmula TRANslation. A language for mathematical applications.
Pascal	The VME Pascal compiler was written at the Computer Science Departments of the Universities of Southampton and Glasgow, and was based on the 1900 Series compiler written at the Universities of Belfast and Glasgow. Like 1900 Pascal, it had a powerful symbolic diagnostics feature inspired by that implemented in ALGOL W by Richard Sites.
SFL	System Function Language – an assembly language. Used to write VME/K and the kernel of 2900 IDMS. SFL was originally named MAPLE, for Macro Assembly Programming Language. It presented the 2900 Series Primitive Level Interface along with a set of useful macros. However, assembly language programming was positively discouraged by ICL Sales & Marketing, so the tool was renamed to be more in accord with the branding of the 2900 Series as a high level language architecture. SFL was not available to customers as a standard product, though it could be obtained if there were good reasons.
C	C compilers only became available on VME in the mid-1980s, being needed to port relational database products such as Ingres and Oracle. Portability of C applications suffered from the assumptions made by many C programmers that characters would be encoded in ASCII and that short integers would always be 16 bits long (the 2900 architecture allows 32-bit, 64-bit, and 128-bit arithmetic, but 16-bit arithmetic has to be implemented in software and is therefore inefficient).
Application Master (AM)	Batch and TP application generation from the Data Dictionary System

== 2903 range ==
The 2903 range was a rapid development to produce a small business computer to replace the 1901A. As far as possible it was developed from existing hardware and software, but configured for an office environment without underfloor cabling. It was urgently needed to generate a cashflow that would support continuing 2900 development. The hardware was based on the 2900 DFC (Disk File Controller), and used the MICOS engine. The 2903/4 system cabinet housed the MICOS engine, Drico FEDS disk storage and a punched card reader. A wing attached at 45 degrees carried the operator's console which was a visual display unit (VDU): for 1900 users who were accustomed to the Westrex teletype as console, this was a major advance. The printers abutted to the wing and were initially integrated; they were soon replaced by the CPI shuttle printer and PBS. The printers ran at 300 or 600 lines per minute, selected by a hidden link.

The 2903 used microcode to emulate 1900 hardware. The operating system was George 1* (a modification of George 1S batch operating system) running on top of the UDAS Executive. In consequence, the 1900 compilers and utilities ran on the 290x range without any changes or recompilation. For some sites a microcode floppy was available that would make the system work as an IBM 360 running the IBM operating system, although this entailed changing the removable hard drives as the formats were completely different.

A new feature provided on this range was Direct Data Entry, a system with up to eight dedicated VDU data entry stations, with which card image files could be created; these could be assigned to a program's card reader and processed accordingly.

There were three models in the range:

- 2903
- 2904
- 2905 (rebrand of 2950 running DME/2)

290x computers would run in an office environment, still quite an innovation for this class of machine, and were a runaway success. Roughly 3,000 systems were sold, ten times as many as ICL had anticipated.

- ME29

The smaller machines in the 290x family were replaced in 1980 by the ME29 system.

=== Operating systems and software ===
==== Executive ====
The 290x operating system, known as 'Executive', allowed the machines to be operated 'manually' via a video console. GEORGE1* ran on top of Executive to control batch processes by means of JCL (Job Control Language), which was based very closely upon the macro language of the 1900 GEORGE1S operating system.

==== TME (Transaction Machine Environment) ====
TME was the operating system on the ME29 and required CL (Control Language) to run jobs – 'manual' operation being discouraged.

Practically all the software packages available on the 1900 range ran on the 290x and ME29 systems.

In about 1982, a new Transaction Processing System TME-TP was introduced for the ME29, with a subset of the facilities of TPMS (cf 2900 software).

TME came bundled with a hierarchical database management system called RAPID (Record Access Program Independent of Data). This was built around 1900 IDMS, and consisted of a set of user interfaces which provided a "user friendly" graphical database schema design and configuration environment, and an RML COBOL-based programming environment. Everything was compiled into the equivalent 1900 IDMS objects for use at run time.

== Personal computers ==
Amidst the broader appearance of personal computers in the early 1980s, ICL introduced the DRS 20, a system supporting multiple DRS 20 Model 10 (or DRS 10) client machines, each equipped with the 8085 processor, accessing Model 40 and Model 50 file storage computers over an ICL network. In this context, ICL's commitment to the emerging microcomputer market was questioned by industry commentators who regarded the DRS 10 as a missed opportunity, producing a machine whose £2,250 price was elevated substantially by a £1,000 network card that could have been replaced with a disk controller to deliver a competitive standalone, but network-ready, CP/M system. ICL later added support for running CP/M under the DRX operating system, permitting CP/M applications to be used on DRS 10 machines.

ICL launched its Personal Computer range in 1982, licensing technology from Rair and effectively adopting the established Rair Black Box product as its own, an approach described as "a prime example of badge engineering" in one assessment of the range. In common with the DRS 20 models, the Rair design also used the 8085 processor, and the Personal Computer range consisted of the low-level Model 10 with 64 KB of RAM, dual floppy drives and two serial ports; the Model 30 as an upgraded Model 10, replacing one floppy drive with a hard drive; the Model 31 as an upgraded Model 30 with 128 KB of RAM and four serial ports; and the Model 32, upgrading the Model 31 to 256 KB of RAM and eight serial ports. The Model 31 and 32 were categorised as multi-user systems. CP/M and MP/M were offered as operating systems.

In 1983, ICL followed up with more designs licensed from Rair, also using the 8085, and running CP/M and MP/M. The Models 15, 25, 26 and 35 broadly superseded the earlier models, utilising a faster 8085A processor that could be upgraded to the 8088 processor. They supported RAM expansion up to 512 KB, increased the base provision of serial ports to four and permitted eight on any model, increased the floppy and hard drive storage capacity, and introduced disk caching and RAM disk functionality. A Model 36 followed in 1984 at the top of the range, fitted with an 8088 processor as standard and supporting Concurrent CP/M. 1985 saw another Rair-derived product, the ICL Quattro, a multi-user system employing a single 8086 processor and 8087 floating-point coprocessor, running Concurrent CP/M, and supporting multiple serial terminals.

ICL licensed other external designs, obtaining exclusive marketing rights for the Three Rivers Computer Corporation PERQ workstation, along with design and manufacturing involvement in PERQ products. At the lower end of the market, the company adopted the basic design of the Sinclair QL for its One Per Desk (1984), whose interoperability with contemporary systems rested largely on the bundled Psion Xchange software. Despite interest from ICL's management in developing a lower cost version of the PERQ for the office automation market, the company's office systems division were reportedly "not too keen" on the PERQ, being invested in the One Per Desk and other existing office system products. Consequently, ICL marketed the PERQ as a scientific workstation.

ICL also supplied British Telecom with various models in its Merlin range of electronic office products, starting in 1983 with the M2226 small business computer, M1100 terminal, and M3300 communicating word processor, all offering connectivity features. The M2200 series was augmented with the low-end M2215 in 1984. In 1985, the One Per Desk joined these models in the BT Merlin portfolio as the Merlin Tonto.

== Departmental systems ==
For many years ICL marketed departmental computers under the DRS brand, standing originally for Distributed Resource System. During the mid-1980s, separate Office Systems business units had produced a disparate range of products including IBM-compatible PCs such as the PWS (an AT clone), small servers branded DRS, and a range of larger Unix servers sold under the Clan name. A re-branding in late 1988 pulled these together under the DRS brand, with a consistent grey and green livery.

In the mid-1980s ICL developed the DRS 300 in Kidsgrove, and ran down Utica.

In 1994 the DRS range was superseded by the SuperServer and TeamServer ranges of SPARC and Intel-based machines, running Unix or Microsoft operating systems.

== OEM products ==
In the early 1970s, ICL signed an OEM agreement with the Canadian company, Consolidated Computers Ltd (later Consolidated Computer Inc.) to distribute CCL's key-to-disk data entry product, Key-Edit, in the British Commonwealth of countries as well as in western and eastern Europe. Models included Key Edit 100, 50, 59, 1000, and 2000. In the mid-1980s a version of the Key Edit 59 operating system was ported (in emulation mode) to the DRS 20 series and marketed as Data Entry 20.

== Subsidiaries ==
=== Dataskil ===
Dataskil Ltd or ICL Dataskil was a software house, formed from an internal department known as the User Programming Service (UPS), that developed commercial programs and some utility software for the ICL marketplace. Dataskil also provided consultants and project teams to work on ICL's or direct clients' 1900 and 2900 projects. There were several divisions within Dataskil, including Consultancy Services, Transition Services, Project Management Services (PMS), etc.

Dataskil software products included:

For 1900 series	For 2900 series	Others
1900 Datadrive; 1900 Datafeed; 1900 Dataview; 1900 IDMS; 1900 Filan	2900 IDH (Interactive Data Handler); 2900 LP (Linear Programming); 2900 OMAC; 2900 PERT; Applications Manager	Wordskil

==== 1900 Filan ====
The ICL 1900 Filan manual (1st edition January 1973) describes Filan as:

"a totally integrated system for the analysis of large quantities of complex data such as that collected in censuses and other surveys".

It was used to process the 1971 Indonesian Population Census. In the UK, Filan was used during the 1970s by the Office of Population Censuses and Surveys to process the General Household Survey data. As there was only a small user community, ICL decided not to convert the software to run on its 2900 range of computers in the 1980s.

=== With Barclays Bank: BARIC Computing Services Ltd ===
This was a joint venture of International Computer Services Ltd (ICSL), a division of ICL, and Barclays, that provided computer services. In the early days of computing many organizations avoided the capital costs of purchasing their own equipment and the recruitment of technical specialists by putting their work out to service companies, such as BARIC, which were known as computer bureaux. BARIC also ran special groups such as the Advanced Videotex team, which investigated how new technologies such as Prestel could be leveraged.

This company operated two ICL 1900 mainframes (1904E and 1905S, in manual and GEORGE II operating system modes) from its head office in Newman Street, London. This site housed management, sales and support staff and a large programming team (site closed late 1975). Sales and support offices were in Belfast, Birmingham, Bristol, Cork, Dublin, Glasgow, Stoke-on-Trent, Leeds, Forest Gate, Hartree House Queensway, St Paul's Churchyard, Putney (ICL headquarters) and Manchester. The Queensway site was above Whiteleys department store, and had been used in the 1950s and 1960s by the LEO arm of food company J. Lyons to run data processing and an early bureau service.

Chris Gent was the managing director from 1979 to 1985, when he left to lead Vodafone. In 1985, most of BARIC's bureau business was acquired by CMG (Computer Management Group).

=== India: ICIM ===
ICL had established a presence in India in its earliest days, through International Computers Indian Manufacture Ltd (ICIM), a partly owned subsidiary. As the name implies, ICIM took on some of the manufacturing of ICL-designed equipment, generally for overseas markets. In later years ICIM, from its offices in Pune, started to establish a presence in the market for offshore software development and eventually outsourcing of the operation of computer services. ICIM subsequently became a joint operation with Fujitsu, establishing links to Japan that were as strong as its traditional links to the UK. Reflecting the shift in its business, the company was renamed ICIL (International Computers India Limited), and again in 2000 to Zensar Technologies, a publicly traded company which has RPG Group as its largest shareholder.

=== Defence: DESC ===
DESC Ltd (subsequently ICL DESC Ltd.) was a subsidiary focused on defence systems spun out from ICL at the time of the Fujitsu takeover, to avoid concerns over defence systems ownership by the Japanese firm, as it was involved with battlefield systems which might be unconstitutional in Japan. These qualms were overcome and eventually it was merged back into the parent company.

=== Banking: iBANK Systems ===
iBANK Systems was a joint venture with Xcelsoft, Inc. of Canada to develop a Unix-based integrated retail banking system capable of distributed operation. Supported platforms included the DRS-6000 and DRS-3000, and the product was written in COBOL with some 'glue' written in C. The international team was based in Greenville SC, US.

The venture lasted from 1992 through 1995 when the two companies dissolved the relationship and each went forward independently, thereby forking the project. The ICL branch was renamed Fujitsu-ICL International Banking Products, and continued operations until 2000 when ICL withdrew completely from operations in North America. Customers of iBANK Systems included Moscow Savings Bank (Russia), Suprimex (Russia), Chelindbank (Russia, project cancelled at the try-test phase), Mineral Bank (Bulgaria), Romanian Bank for Development (Romania), PTC (Zimbabwe), People's Own Savings Bank (Zimbabwe), Mutual Bank of the Caribbean (Barbados), National Commercial Bank (Jamaica), and Caisse Populaire (Canada).

=== ICL Pathway and the Horizon system ===
In May 1996, ICL Pathway Limited (later Fujitsu Services (Pathway) Limited) was awarded the private finance initiative contract to develop the Horizon IT system to modernize Post Office and Benefits Agency operations. The project encountered a number of delays and setbacks during development, causing the Benefits Agency to abandon it in 1999, which led to a £180 million write-off at ICL and £571 million at the Post Office. The project in large part led to reputational damage to the ICL brand, causing the renaming of the company to Fujitsu Services in April 2002, and later to just Fujitsu.

Horizon provided both a replacement for the Post Office's paper-based in-branch accounting, and point-of-sale functions. In 2004, Fujitsu described Horizon as "Europe's largest non-military IT contract". Richard Christou, who was chief executive from 2000 to 2004, later stated he led the original commercial negotiations on the Pathway project, and over the following 25 years it had been ICL and Fujitsu UK's "most profitable" project.

Data from Horizon was later used to prosecute more than 900 sub-postmasters over unexplained losses, but it was found by the High Court in 2019 that "bugs, errors and defects" within the system could have caused the shortfalls. As of 2023, offers of compensation totalled more than £120 million and a public enquiry into the matter is ongoing.

== Corporate history ==
This section describes the various takeovers of and by ICL that followed its formation in 1969.

=== Singer Business Machines ===
Early in 1976, ICL acquired the international (that is, non-US) part of Singer Business Machines. The Singer group, a holding company which had diversified by adding many divisions, the most well-known of which was its early roots in sewing machines, and others such as the Business Machine division which was acquired by purchasing Friden, a San Leandro computer company, whose flagship product was the System Ten, a small business minicomputer. SBM had also acquired Cogar Corporation, a manufacturer of desktop intelligent terminals in Utica, New York, which after the ICL acquisition became the development and manufacturing plant for both minicomputers and terminals. The acquisition shifted the geographical balance of ICL's sales away from the UK, and also gave a presence in industry markets such as retail and manufacturing. ICL subsequently developed the System Ten into the System 25, and used the product to spearhead the growth of its Retail Systems business during the 1980s.

=== 1981 crisis ===
ICL was in financial difficulty in 1981, with weak export performance against American and Japanese competition, and a takeover by an American manufacturer seemed likely. Christophor Laidlaw, deputy chairman of BP, was appointed as chairman and achieved a financial reconstruction, supported by loan guarantees from the government. He also oversaw the start of a technology agreement with Japan's Fujitsu, and implemented a revised corporate strategy introduced by managing director Robb Wilmot, formerly of Texas Instruments. Fujitsu's VLSI technologies were to be employed in the next generation of ICL's mainframe products, eventually introduced as the Series 39. In 1984, Laidlaw was succeeded by Sir Michael Edwardes, previously chairman of motor manufacturer British Leyland.

=== STC ===
On 26 July 1984, a £400 million takeover bid for ICL arrived from Sir Kenneth Corfield, head of Standard Telephones and Cables (STC). The stated rationale was the predicted convergence of computers and telecommunications. The ICL board recommended acceptance of the bid, and the takeover was completed on 10 September. Sir Michael Edwardes, who had been chairman for just six months, resigned, and Laidlaw returned briefly as chairman. Robb Wilmot, who had arrived as managing director in 1981 (at the age of 36) remained, along with Peter Bonfield as marketing director.

The takeover caused losses at STC, leading in 1985 to a rights issue and Corfield's replacement by Lord Keith as STC chairman, with Arthur Walsh as chief executive. Wilmot resigned, and Bonfield was appointed chairman and managing director of ICL. Within a few years ICL was contributing 60% of the profits and turnover of the combined group. Bonfield was appointed CBE for his role in turning the company around.

STC's ongoing difficulties led to it considering the sale of ICL in the late 1980s. Few British candidates were apparent as potential buyers, and the company pursued talks in 1989 with Olivetti regarding a possible sale. Although an agreement was almost reached, ICL's management strongly favoured an arrangement with Fujitsu, also rebuffing an apparent interest in the company from Unisys.

=== Datachecker ===
In 1988, STC acquired US retail systems specialist Datachecker Systems from National Semiconductor Corporation. At the time this was the second largest supplier in the US retail market, and greatly expanded ICL's US presence.

=== Regnecentralen ===
In 1989, ICL acquired Regnecentralen of Denmark, a company with a distinguished history and reputation in that country, but which was best known internationally for its front-end communications handling equipment.

=== Computer Consoles Inc ===
Also in 1989, STC acquired CCI, suppliers of ICL's Clan 5, 6 and 7 ranges (later DRS 500) and originator of OfficePower. By 1990 CCI's Computer Products Division in Irvine, California, and Office Products Centre in Reston, Virginia, had been transferred to ICL.

=== Nokia Data ===
In 1991, ICL acquired Nokia Data, part of Nokia. Nokia Data was itself the result of Nokia's mid-1980s acquisition of Ericsson Information Systems, whose origins lay in the purchase by Ericsson of the computer business of Saab, known as Datasaab. Financed with £30 million in cash, £180 million in preferred stock, and the assumption of £100 million of Nokia Data's debt, ICL's acquisition added 7,000 employees to the company (bringing the group's total workforce to 21,000) and, with £700 million in revenue, effectively gave ICL a turnover of £2 billion. The acquisition brought with it a PC manufacturing capability, a suite of desktop software products, and more importantly a strong presence in the Nordic market and an awareness of the high-volume end of the IT market.

=== ICL KME-CS ===
In July 1991, ICL acquired more than half of the Russian company KME-CS (Kazan Manufacturing Enterprise of Computer Systems, Kazan, Tatarstan, Russia). The agreement was signed between Peter Bonfield (President of ICL) and Mintimer Shaimiev (President of the Tatarstan Republic).

=== Fujitsu relationship and eventual acquisition ===
ICL's relationship with Fujitsu started in 1981, when ICL needed a cheaper source of technology to develop lower-end machines in the 2900 range to compete with the IBM 4300 series. At this stage ICL was developing its own large scale integration (LSI) technology for use in the higher-end machines, designed as a successor to the highly successful 2966 processor (known internally as S3). ICL personnel had visited a number of companies during 1980, including Fujitsu and Hitachi, to identify potential suppliers.

As part of the 1981 restructuring, Robb Wilmot – an electronics engineer and former head of Texas Instruments' British-based calculator operation – arrived as CEO in May 1981. He cancelled in-house LSI technology development, and negotiated an agreement that gave access to Fujitsu's LSI and packaging technologies, which, when combined with ICL's in-house CAD capability, enabled ICL to design and manufacture the DM1 and Estriel machines, later marketed profitably as Series 39 level 30 and 80.

Initially the collaboration with Fujitsu was presented as being an arm's length one, to avoid diluting ICL's credentials as a European and British company. However, Fujitsu's involvement with ICL at both the financial and the technical level steadily increased over the subsequent two decades, and in 1990 Fujitsu acquired 80% of ICL plc from its parent STC plc, paying US$1.29 billion. In 1998 Fujitsu became ICL's sole shareholder and the ICL brand was dropped in 2002.

Long term chief executive Keith Todd, in place for 13 years, planned to float ICL on the stock exchange, but due to intermittent financial difficulties in some units of the company and the realisation that the parts of ICL sold separately were worth a lot more on the market than ICL as a whole, this was abandoned in 2000. Todd resigned and was replaced by Richard Christou, who dismantled the complicated matrix management structure, rationalised the balance sheet and sold some smaller units. One of ICL's past acquisitions, CFM (Computer Facilities Management), was a key profitable outsourcing unit which originated from local government and managed both ICL and other manufacturer large customer installations. Christou expanded this unit, moving the company further into services and away from being a computer supplier. Christou later said "big outsourcing contracts, despite all their problems, actually were, and still are, the profit drivers in ICL".

=== Fujitsu Siemens ===
Following the acquisition of Nokia Data in 1991, personal computers and servers were marketed under the ICL brand. This changed when Fujitsu Siemens Computers was formed in 1999 as a joint venture between Fujitsu and Siemens. The joint venture absorbed all ICL's hardware business with the exception of VME mainframes, and all the business of Siemens Nixdorf with the exception of its banking and retail systems. Fujitsu Siemens was merged back into Fujitsu in 2009.

=== PC Interworks Ltd ===
PC Interworks was incorporated in October 1995. It was created as a sales company, selling personal computer and other IT equipment to the employees of large organisations. The company, which evolved from a concept developed within ICL, began business with a contract from ICL to provide computer related products to its staff, as a part of its Employee Benefit Programme. PC Interworks was subsequently absorbed by International Computer Logistics Limited.

=== Transfer of ICL trademark to International Computer Logistics ===
International Computer Logistics, a British company specialising in IT repair and data recovery, secured the intellectual property rights to the ICL brand in 2014. It is based in Kidsgrove, North Staffordshire and was formed in 2012.

== ICL Fellowship ==
ICL Engineers responsible for pioneering achievements in the field of Computing could be recognised through the ICL Fellowship, established in 1990 by then-CEO Sir Peter Bonfield. The Fellows represented the peak of technological expertise within ICL and directly advised the company leadership on technology matters.

== See also ==
- Odra (computer) – the Polish Odra 1300 series computers used ICL software
