= Daniel Jackson (computer scientist) =

American computer scientist (born 1963)

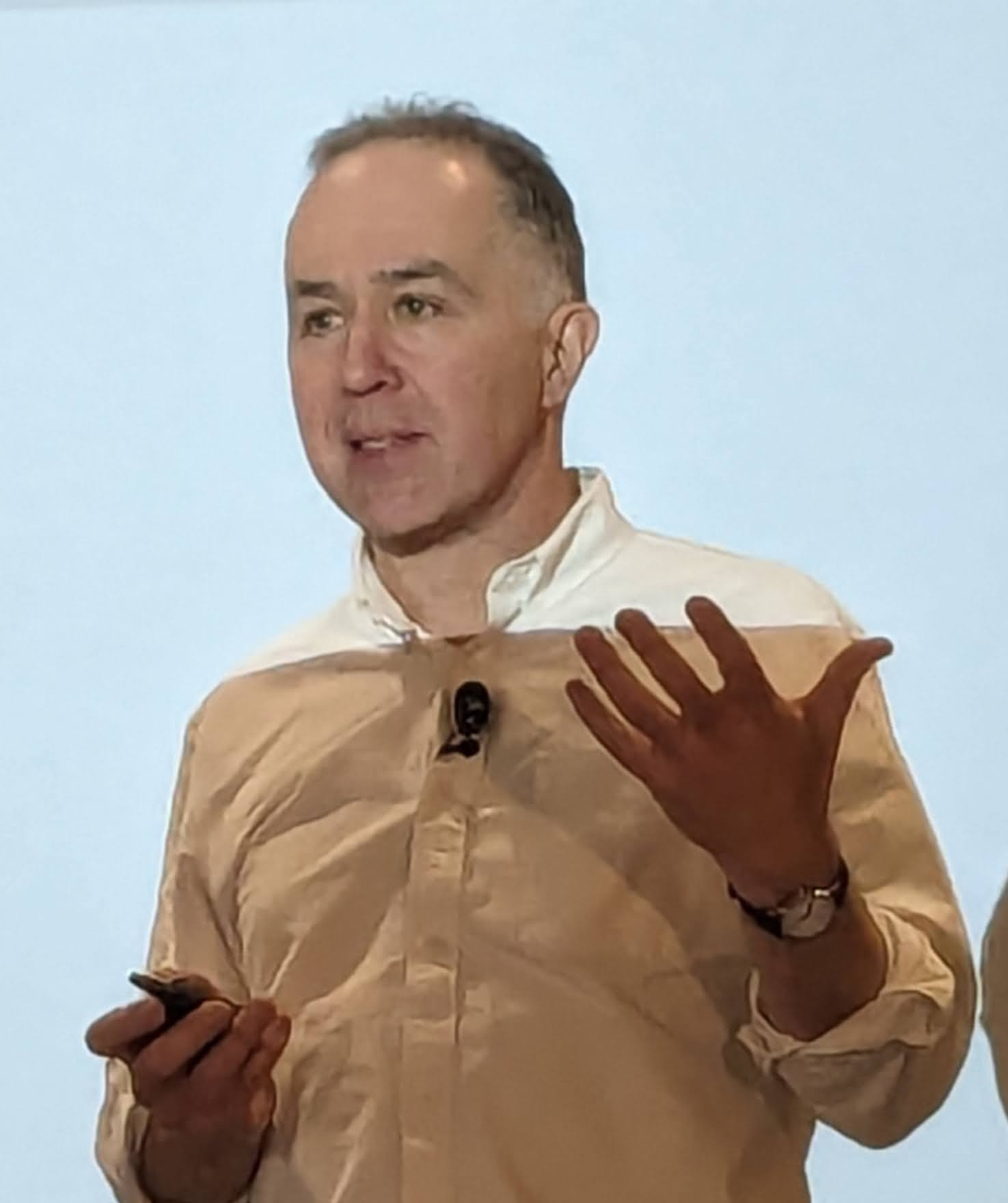
- Education: Massachusetts Institute of Technology (PhD); University of Oxford (M.A.)
- Occupation: Computer scientist
- Known for: Lightweight formal methods, and the Alloy specification language
- Scientific career
- Workplaces: Massachusetts Institute of Technology
- Doctoral advisor: John Guttag

Daniel Jackson (born 1963) is a professor of computer science at the Massachusetts Institute of Technology (MIT). He is the principal designer of the Alloy modelling language, and author of the books Software Abstractions: Logic, Language, and Analysis and The Essence of Software. He leads the Software Design Group at MIT's Computer Science and Artificial Intelligence Laboratory.

== Biography ==
Jackson was born in London, England, in 1963. He studied physics at the University of Oxford, receiving an MA in 1984. After completing his MA, Jackson worked for two years as a software engineer at Logica UK Ltd. He then returned to academia to study computer science at MIT, where he received an SM in 1988, and a PhD in 1992. Following the completion of his doctorate Jackson took up a position as an assistant professor of computer science at Carnegie Mellon University, which he held until 1997. He has been on the faculty of the Department of Electrical Engineering and Computer Science at MIT since 1997. In 2017 he became a Fellow of the Association for Computing Machinery. In the same year, he was awarded the ACM SIGSOFT Outstanding Research Award.

Jackson is also a photographer, and has an interest in the straight photography style. The MIT Museum commissioned a series of photographs of MIT laboratories from him, displayed from May to December 2012, to accompany an exhibit of images by Berenice Abbott. Jackson is the son of software engineering researcher Michael A. Jackson, developer of Jackson Structured Programming (JSP), Jackson System Development (JSD), and the Problem Frames Approach.

== Research ==
Jackson's research is broadly concerned with improving the dependability of software. He is a proponent of lightweight formal methods. Jackson and his students developed the Alloy language and its associated Alloy Analyzer analysis tool to provide support for lightweight specification and modelling efforts.

Between 2004 and 2007, Jackson chaired a multi-year United States National Research Council study on dependable systems.

== Selected publications ==
- Jackson, Daniel; Thomas, Martyn; Millett, Lynette I., eds. (May 2007). Software for Dependable Systems: Sufficient Evidence?. Washington, DC: The National Academies Press. doi:10.17226/11923. ISBN 978-0-309-10394-7.
- Jackson, Daniel (April 2006). Software Abstractions: Logic, Language, and Analysis. Cambridge, MA: MIT Press. ISBN 978-0-262-10114-1.
- Jackson, Daniel (June 2006). "Dependable Software by Design". Scientific American. 294 (6): 68–75. Bibcode:2006SciAm.294f..68J. doi:10.1038/scientificamerican0606-68. PMID 16711362.
- Jackson, Daniel (April 2002). "Alloy: A Lightweight Object Modelling Notation" (PDF). ACM Transactions on Software Engineering and Methodology. 11 (2): 256–290. doi:10.1145/505145.505149. S2CID 5683166.
