= Cades =

Cades may refer to:

== Places ==
- Cades, South Carolina
- Cades Cove, East Tennessee of U.S.
- Cadesh, Ruins of an ancient citadel on the Israeli-Lebanese border
- Kadesh (biblical), place on the southern border of ancient Israel

== Computing ==
- CAdES (computing), CMS Advanced Electronic Signature Format
- CADES, computer software for system development

== Painter ==
- Giuseppe Cades, Italian painter and sculptor
