= DLBD =

DLBD may refer to:

- Dementia with Lewy bodies, also called diffuse Lewy body disease (DLBD)
- Dictionary of Literary Biography: Documentary series
- Dual-layer Blu-ray Disc
- a command in SCL (System Control Language), of the ICL VME operating system
