= JSD =

JSD may refer to:

- Jackson system development, in software engineering
- Japanese School of Detroit, Michigan, US
- Jatiya Samajtantrik Dal, Bangladesh
- Jennings School District, Missouri, US
- Jensen–Shannon divergence, in statistics
- Juridicae Scientiae Doctor, a law degree
