= TPMS =

TPMS may refer to:

- Takoma Park Middle School, in Maryland, US
- Tire-pressure monitoring system
- Transaction Processing Management System, ICL computer software
- Triply periodic minimal surface, an aspect of differential geometry
