= Treasury Organization and Methods =

The Treasury Organization and Methods (O&M) Division was a branch of the British Civil Service under HM Treasury responsible for improving administrative efficiency across government departments. Established in 1919 as the Treasury Investigating Section and renamed Organization and Methods in 1941, the division applied systematic methods to office organization with the aim of reducing costs and labor while improving standards of service. Over the following decades it became the primary expert body responsible for the mechanization and eventual computerization of British government administration, overseeing the introduction of punched-card machinery and, later, electronic computers across dozens of departments.

At its peak in the 1950s and 1960s, the division oversaw the transition from manual clerical work to electronic stored-program computing and established itself within Whitehall as the recognized center of expertise in data processing. Its influence extended beyond central government to nationalized industries and private firms through an Advisory Panel of Businessmen. The division declined in the late 1960s following the Fulton Report of 1968, which transferred its functions to the newly created Civil Service Department, diminishing the authority it had derived from its position within the Treasury. In its place a number of smaller, more specialized bodies emerged, the most direct successor being the Central Computer Agency.

== Purpose ==
Originally, the Treasury O&M was tasked as the center for all O&M functions within the British government. It conducted investigations on departments without O&M departments, provided trained staff for those that did, developed standard procedures, and approved office machinery requests.

Raymond Nottage, Director of the Royal Institute of Public Administration, described the division's work as:

The process of giving systematic and "scientific" study to the organisation of an authority, or a department of an authority, and to the detailed methods of work which are employed within the various departments. Its objects, simply, are to secure economies in cost and labour, and improvements in standards of service.

In practice, this meant the division acted as an internal consultancy, embedding expert officers across Whitehall to assess and reform administrative processes.

== History ==
=== Origins ===
The Treasury Investigating Section was formed in 1919 to advise on the mechanization of British government departments. Its establishment was shaped by the Haldane and Bradbury Committees, which recommended that the Treasury create a separate branch staffed with experts to make frequent investigations into the administration of government departments. The section was tasked with advising on office appliances, registers, and statistics to ensure the most efficient and economical methods were employed across Whitehall before the Treasury approved funding for additional staff or equipment.

In 1941, after James Reid Young published a report on the development of the Treasury Investigating Section calling for increased status and direction for the unit, it was renamed Organization and Methods (O&M).

=== Wartime and postwar mechanization ===
The Treasury O&M grew in size during and after the Second World War, from a staff of 46 in 1942 to 87 in 1949. Industry expertise was brought in through private consultants and an Advisory Panel of Businessmen that met monthly. It also expanded into the British Civil Service, with 19 O&M divisions established in other major departments by 1946.

Sir Isaac James Pitman served as the Director from 1943 to 1945. He created training documents defining how O&M officers should approach government mechanization requirements. His six “basic elements of communication” were as follows:

1. Collecting information.
2. Checking information and checking recording for accuracy.
3. Making information conveniently comprehensible.
4. Recording and reduplicating information.
5. Storing information.
6. Moving information and/or material.

In 1946, Pitman's successor, J. R. Simpson, identified a shift in the purpose of mechanization, away from cost reduction and toward decreasing labor demands with a broader positive change in official attitudes toward mechanization within government. That same year, the division proposed mechanizing sick-leave statistics. In 1947, the Treasury's Machinery of Government Section was incorporated into the Treasury O&M, expanding its mandate to improve the efficiency of government machinery.

O&M officers were appointed not only within the central government but also in nationalized industries and large private corporations. The division became the authoritative central point for mechanization decisions, functioning as the expert advisers for such projects. By 1948, twenty-six government departments had or were in the process of acquiring punched-card machines, with 50 installations in place. By 1954, 80 machines supported accounting, statistics, and payroll functions within the government.

A 1948 report recommended centralizing government data processing in London. This led to the creation of an Inter-Departmental Study Group in 1950 to consider the case for merging statistical installations across nineteen London statistical punched-card units. Two years later, the Combined Tabulating Installation was set up to consolidate data-processing operations, reducing both capital and labor costs.

=== Computerization ===
The Brunt Committee was assembled in the early 1950s to research the uses of the electronic computer, initially focusing on scientific purposes but later also on clerical work. The Treasury O&M was originally skeptical of computerization, judging that increased processing speeds would not justify the cost and technical difficulties involved in implementation.

In 1955, James Merriman, a radio engineer, was appointed as the Deputy Director and head of the Office of Machines branch within the Treasury O&M as the division moved to recruit more technical staff. In 1956, Merriman toured the United States to survey the most recent developments in computer technology. The visit included IBM, NCR, Remington Rand, the National Bureau of Standards, and the Bureau of the Census. His subsequent 1957 report, presented to Sir Norman Brook, head of the Home Civil Service, outlined existing government data-processing projects and a computerization proposal. It proposed a ten-year computer installation program, divided into two phases, and overseen by a Standing Advisory Committee. The Treasury O&M would provide support, and a Steering Committee for Automatic Data Processing was established to analyze reports written by the Treasury O&M.

By 1957, the Treasury O&M had become an enthusiastic advocate for computing in modern administration. The shift was driven by technical demonstrations, such as the LEO computer, critical media coverage in the Financial Times, and aligned interests within the Treasury. It established itself as the center of expertise in electronic data processing, and was a primary target for lobbying by firms like Ferranti to encourage broader government adoption of computers.

The division's computerization agenda was further accelerated under the Wilson government in the 1960s, whose rhetoric of technological modernization aligned closely with O&M's program. By 1965, forty-five government computers had been installed, and the division issued a report recommending the procurement of an additional 200 computers. The division also promoted the software package PERT (Program Evaluation and Review Technique) through campaigns aimed at senior management.

=== Decline ===
In November 1968, following the Fulton Report's recommendation, the O&M was transferred out of the Treasury and into the new Civil Service Department, which ended its combined oversight over both finance and personnel. Without this "joint authority," the O&M lost its ability to enforce a unified administrative code across Whitehall. A combination of a narrowing institutional scope, the formation of the ICL (International Computers Limited), and the introduction of organization and management as a mainstream subject further eroded the influence of the Treasury O&M division.

The division was succeeded by the Central Computer Agency (CCA) in 1972, which later became the Central Computer and Telecommunications Agency (CCTA) in 1979. By the 1990s, the remnants of the O&M were largely absorbed into the Office of Government Commerce.

== Legacy ==
The Treasury O&M Division is credited with establishing administrative science in Britain as an expert-led discipline, spreading O&M principles across central government and into private industry. Jon Agar, in The Government Machine: A Revolutionary History of the Computer, argues that the division's work helped establish the electronic computer as a materialization of bureaucratic action, providing a conceptual foundation for how modern governments process and manage information.

The Treasury O&M's long-term vision of a seamless "government machine" prefigured modern e-government initiatives, such as "joined-up government" and centralized digital portals. The loss of internal technical expertise has been linked by some historians to the emergence of the "hollowed-out state," in which substantial government information technology functions were transferred to private contractors instead of internal expert-led public administration.
