= TickIT =

Software quality system certification program

TickIT is a certification program for companies in the software development and computer industries, supported primarily by the United Kingdom and Swedish industries through UKAS and SWEDAC respectively. Its general objective is to improve software quality.

== History ==
In the 1980s, the UK government's CCTA organisation promoted the use of IT standards in the UK public sector, with work on BS5750 (Quality Management) leading to the publishing of the Quality Management Library and the inception of the TickIT assessment scheme with DTI, MoD and participation of software development companies.

== The TickIT Guide ==
TickIT also includes a guide. This provides guidance in understanding and applying ISO 9001 in the IT industry. It gives a background to the TickIT scheme, including its origins and objectives. Furthermore, it provides detailed information on how to implement a Quality System and the expected structure and content relevant to software activities. The TickIT guide also assists in defining appropriate measures and/or metrics. Various TickIT Guides have been issued, including "Guide to Software Quality Management and Certification using EN29001".
