= Alloy (specification language) =

Declarative specification language

In computer science and software engineering, Alloy is a declarative specification language for expressing complex structural constraints and behavior in a software system. Alloy provides a simple structural modeling tool based on first-order logic. Alloy is targeted at the creation of micro-models that can then be automatically checked for correctness. Alloy specifications can be checked using the Alloy Analyzer.

Although Alloy is designed with automatic analysis in mind, Alloy differs from many specification languages designed for model-checking in that it permits the definition of infinite models. The Alloy Analyzer is designed to perform finite scope checks even on infinite models.

The Alloy language and analyzer are developed by a team led by Daniel Jackson at the Massachusetts Institute of Technology in the United States.

== History and influences ==
The first version of the Alloy language appeared in 1997. It was a rather limited object modeling language. Succeeding iterations of the language "added quantifiers, higher arity relations, polymorphism, subtyping, and signatures".

The mathematical underpinnings of the language were heavily influenced by the Z notation, and the syntax of Alloy owes more to languages such as Object Constraint Language.

== The Alloy Analyzer ==
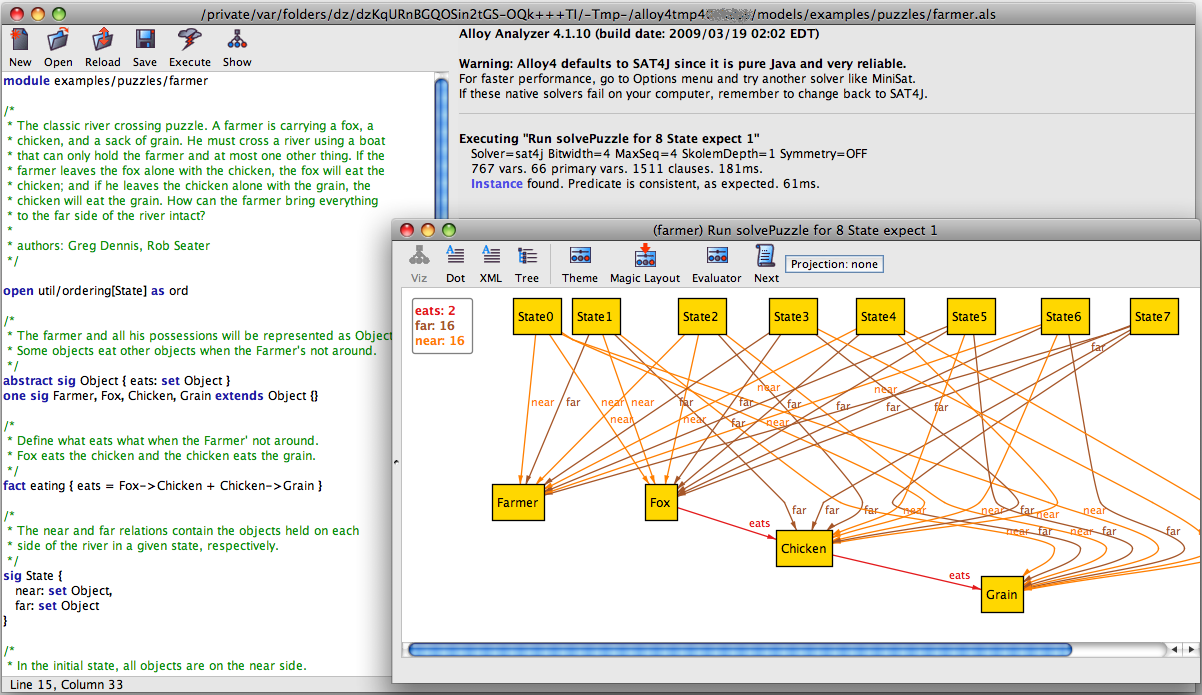
Alloy Analyzer.

The Alloy Analyzer was specifically developed to support so-called "lightweight formal methods". As such, it is intended to provide fully automated analysis, in contrast to the interactive theorem proving techniques commonly used with specification languages similar to Alloy. Development of the Analyzer was originally inspired by the automated analysis provided by model checkers. However, model-checking is ill-suited to the kind of models that are typically developed in Alloy, and as a result the core of the Analyzer was eventually implemented as a model-finder built atop a boolean SAT solver.

Through version 3.0, the Alloy Analyzer incorporated an integral SAT-based model-finder based on an off-the-shelf SAT-solver. However, as of version 4.0 the Analyzer makes use of the Kodkod model-finder, for which the Analyzer acts as a front-end. Both model-finders essentially translate a model expressed in relational logic into a corresponding boolean logic formula, and then invoke an off-the-shelf SAT-solver on the boolean formula. In the event that the solver finds a solution, the result is translated back into a corresponding binding of constants to variables in the relational logic model.

In order to ensure the model-finding problem is decidable, the Alloy Analyzer performs model-finding over restricted scopes consisting of a user-defined finite number of objects. This has the effect of limiting the generality of the results produced by the Analyzer. However, the designers of the Alloy Analyzer justify the decision to work within limited scopes through an appeal to the small scope hypothesis: that a high proportion of bugs can be found by testing a program for all test inputs within some small scope.

== Model structure ==
Alloy models are relational in nature, and are composed of several different kinds of statements:

- Signatures define the vocabulary of a model by creating new sets

sig Object{} defines a signature Object
sig List{ head : lone Node } defines a signature List that contains a field head of type Node and multiplicity lone - this establishes the existence of a relation between Lists and Nodes such that every List is associated with no more than one head Node

- Facts are constraints that are assumed to always hold
- Predicates are parameterized constraints, and can be used to represent operations
- Functions are expressions that return results
- Assertions are assumptions about the model

Because Alloy is a declarative language the meaning of a model is unaffected by the order of statements.
