= Transaction Processing Management System =

Online transaction processing superstructure software

Transaction Processing Management System (TPMS) is an online transaction processing superstructure software from ICL (now Fujitsu Services) that runs on their VME mainframe computers. The first versions were released in the mid-1970s and were sold worldwide.

== Structure ==
The service runs in at least two Virtual Machines (VMs)

- a Control VM (CVM), responsible for connecting, disconnecting terminals and routing messages
- one or more Application VMs (AVMs), responsible for all application processing - receiving input messages and returning output messages.
