= OPCON CCIS =

OPCON, or more fully the Operational Control Command Control and Information System (OPCON CCIS) was a long term computer project run by the Ministry of Defence in the United Kingdom.

== History ==
It started to be developed in 1974, and was initially used operationally as a proof of concept (OPCON PILOT) system for the Royal Navy during Operation Corporate (the Falklands War), and evolved into a wider, "Joint" use when declared Operational in 1986.

== Technology ==
The original role of OPCON CCIS was envisaged as providing an automated message handling system and database for use by Commander-in-Chief Fleet (CINCFLEET) headquarters at Northwood.

The solution was largely based on commercial ADP equipment, supplied by ICL, and the capital cost of the equipment was stated in 1989 to be of the order of £40 million.
