= Olympic Pool =

Olympic Pool may refer to:

- Olympic Pool (Montreal), Canada
- Olympic Pool, Moscow, Russia

== See also ==
- List of Olympic venues in swimming
- Olympic-size swimming pool
