= Double play (disambiguation) =

In baseball, a double play is the act of making two outs during the same continuous play.

Double play or doubleplay may refer to:

- Double play magnetic tape (see Audio tape specifications)
- Double Play!, jazz album
- Double Play, album from Nancy Wilson discography
- "Double Play!", an episode of The Racoons
- Double Play (Twin Peaks)
- Double Play (film) (2017)
- Doubleplay (drive), a combination tape and floppy drive manufactured by ComByte, Inc.
