= Colorado Time Systems =

American company

- Type: Private
- Industry: Sports Timing & Displays
- Founded: 1972; 54 years ago
- Headquarters: Loveland, Colorado
- Area served: Worldwide
- Products: Aquatic Timing & Scoring Systems Sports Scoreboards
- Number of employees: 51-200
- Website: www.coloradotime.com

Colorado Time Systems (CTS) is an American company based in Loveland, Colorado that designs, manufactures, sells, and services aquatic timing systems, scoreboards, LED video displays, and related products.

== History ==
Colorado Time Systems was born in the Test & Measurement division of Hewlett-Packard (HP). HP wanted to explore opportunities in the sports timing industry and chose aquatics because it required such precise measurement. In 1972, a group of HP engineers spun off from HP and founded CTS. In July 2011, Colorado Time Systems was acquired by PlayCore; based in Chattanooga, TN. Colorado Time Systems is part of the Everactive Brands division.

== Colorado Memory Systems ==
In 1985, Colorado Time Systems co-founder William "Bill" Beierwaltes founded Colorado Memory Systems (CMS) as a division of Colorado Time Systems. Whereas Colorado Time Systems focused on timekeeping displays, Beierwaltes founded Colorado Memory Systems chiefly to market data storage products for the burgeoning personal computer industry of the 1980s. Colorado Data later became a major player in the field of quarter-inch cartridge manufacturing with their Jumbo line of drives and spun off from Colorado Time Systems in around 1990. In 1992, CMS was acquired by Hewlett-Packard.

== Sponsorship partners ==
Colorado Time Systems is the official timing, scoring and display partner to: USA Water Polo, US Synchronized Swimming, Mexican Swimming Federation, FINA Junior World Swimming Championship, American Swimming Coaches Association, and China Swimming Association.

== Mentions ==
=== Modern Marvels - History Channel ===
On December 23, 2008, the History Channel series, Modern Marvels, aired an episode titled "Measure It!". This episode discussed various modern methods of precise measurement, including the measurement of time, following the Beijing Olympics. The segment, featuring Colorado Time Systems, talked about the construction of modern timing systems and the history of Swimming Touchpads.

== See also ==
- Aquatic timing system
- Scoreboards
