= Olympic-size swimming pool =

50-metre long swimming pool

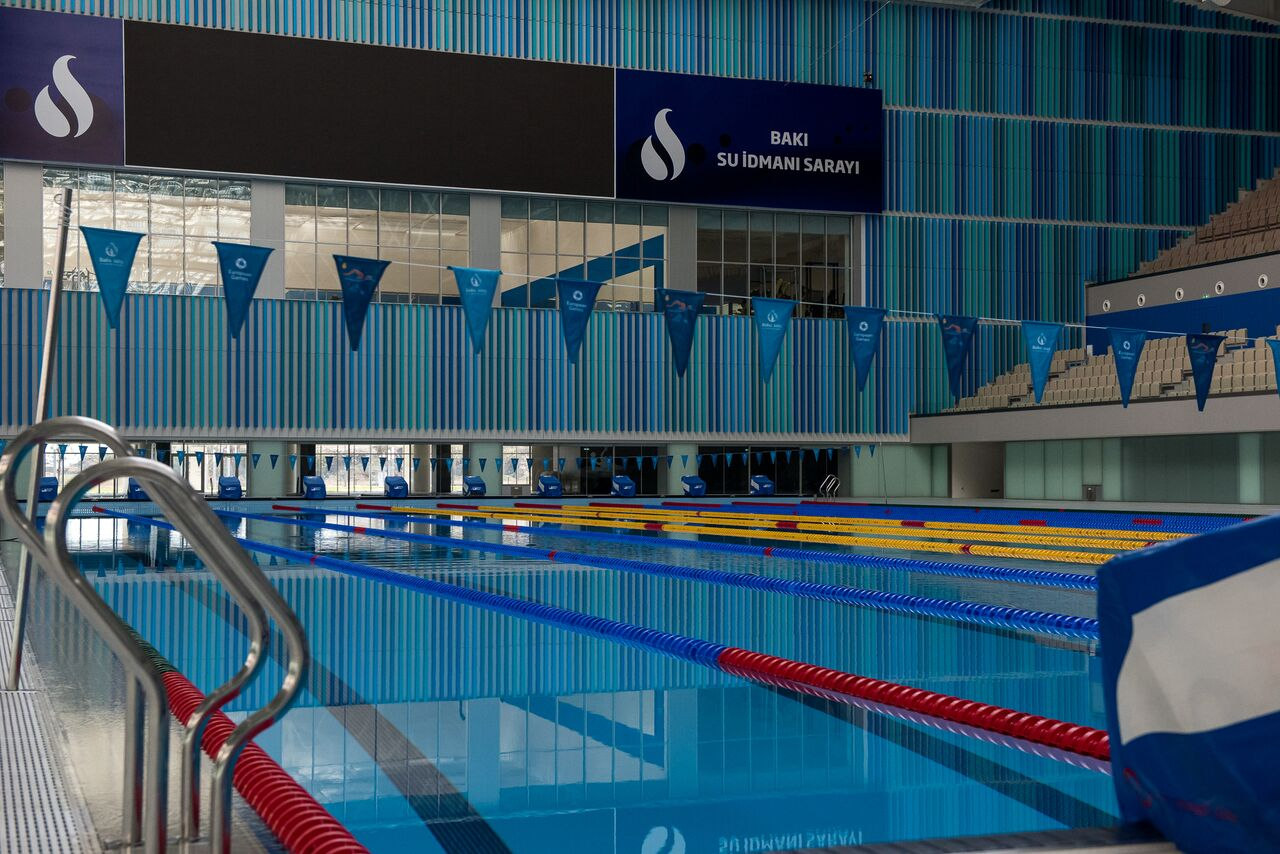
Olympic-sized swimming pool, used for Baku 2015 European Games

An Olympic-size swimming pool is a swimming pool which conforms to the regulations for length, breadth, and depth made by World Aquatics (formerly FINA) for swimming at the Summer Olympics and the swimming events at the World Aquatics Championships. Different size regulations apply for other pool-based events, such as diving, synchronized swimming, and water polo. Less onerous breadth and depth regulations exist for lesser swimming competitions, but any "long course" event requires a course length of 50 metres (164 ft 0.5 in), as distinct from "short course" which applies to competitions in pools that are 25 metres (82 ft 0 in) in length (or 75 feet (22.9 m) in the United States). If touch pads are used in competition, then the distance is relative to the touch pads at either end of the course, so that the pool itself is generally oversized to allow for the thickness of the pads.

An Olympic-size swimming pool is used as a colloquial unit of volume, to make approximate comparisons to similarly sized objects or volumes. It is not a specific definition, as there is no maximum limit on the depth of an Olympic pool. The value has an order of magnitude of 1 megaliter (ML). Some style guides caution against the hyperbole of describing any relatively large pool as "Olympic-size[d]".

== Specifications ==
A simplified diagram of the FINA long course swimming pool standard.

World Aquatics specifications for an Olympic-size pool are as follows:

Physical property	Specified value
Length	50 m (164 ft 1 in)
Width	25 m (82 ft 0 in)
Depth	2 m (6 ft 7 in) minimum, 3 m (9 ft 10 in) recommended when using the pool for multi discipline.
Number of lanes	10
Lane width	2.5 m (8 ft 2 in)
Water temperature	25–28 °C (77–82 °F)
Light intensity	minimum 1500 lux (140 footcandles)
Volume	2,500,000 L (2,500 m^{3}; 660,000 US gal), assuming a nominal depth of 2 m. About 2 acre-feet.

There must be two spaces 2.5 m (8 ft 2 in) wide outside lanes 1 and 8 (in effect, two empty lanes). The length of 50 metres (164 ft) must be between the touch pads at the end of each lane, if they are used. If starting blocks are used, then there must be a minimum depth of 1.35 metres (4.4 ft) from between 1 metre (3 ft 3 in) from the end of the pool to at least 6 metres (19 ft 8 in) from the end of the pool. At all other points, the minimum depth is 1 metre (3 ft 3 in). If the pool is used for Olympic Games or World Championships, then the minimum depth is increased to 2 metres (6 ft 7 in). Whereas the Water Cube pool used for the 2008 Olympics was 3 metres (9 ft 10 in) deep, the temporary pool used in 2024 was only 2.2 metres (7 ft 3 in), which commentators suggested made for slower race times.

== Ten-lane pools ==
At FINA's 2009 Congress, rules were approved for 10-lane courses for competition, as an alternative to the more traditional 8-lane course.

This version of the Olympic-sized swimming pool debuted in the 2008 Beijing Summer Olympics. Beforehand, the Summer Olympics featured the more traditional 8-lane course with a depth of roughly seven feet, now the minimum depth requirement. Twenty-five world records were broken at this pool, although this is more heavily attributed to the polyurethane "supersuits" worn by many competitors (banned by FINA in 2010).

The new Olympic-sized swimming pool was designed to provide advantages to competitors. Increasing the lane count from eight to ten introduces a "buffer lane", helping to absorb waves generated by movements of the swimmers. The increased depth of the pool assists the lane lines in dissipating water churn, thereby creating less hydrodynamic drag.

== See also ==
- Sport venue
- List of long course swimming pools in the United Kingdom
- List of long course swimming pools in the Republic of Ireland
- List of Olympic-size swimming pools in the Philippines
- List of largest swimming pools
- List of Olympic venues in swimming
