= List of Olympic venues in artistic swimming =

For the Summer Olympics, there have been fourteen venues that have been or will be used for artistic swimming, formerly known as synchronised swimming prior to 2016. All of the venues used for this sport are also used for swimming (with the exception of 2024, 2028, and 2032).

Games	Venue	Other sports hosted at venue for those games	Capacity	Ref.
1984 Los Angeles	Olympic Swim Stadium	Diving, Swimming	16,500	
1988 Seoul	Jamsil Indoor Swimming Pool	Diving, Modern pentathlon (swimming), Swimming, Water polo	8,000	
1992 Barcelona	Piscines Bernat Picornell	Modern pentathlon (swimming), Swimming, Water polo (final)	10,000	
1996 Atlanta	Georgia Tech Aquatic Center	Diving, Modern pentathlon (swimming), Swimming, Water polo	15,000	
2000 Sydney	Sydney International Aquatic Centre	Diving, Modern pentathlon (swimming), Swimming, Water polo (men's final)	10,000	
2004 Athens	Athens Olympic Aquatic Centre	Diving, Swimming, Water polo	23,000 (total of three pools)	
2008 Beijing	Beijing National Aquatic Center	Diving, Swimming	17,000	
2012 London	Aquatics Centre	Diving, Modern pentathlon (swimming), Swimming	17,500	
2016 Rio de Janeiro	Maria Lenk Aquatic Center	Diving, Water polo	4,500	
2016 Rio de Janeiro	Olympic Aquatics Stadium (finals)	Swimming, Water polo (finals)	18,000	
2020 Tokyo	Tokyo Aquatics Centre	Diving, Swimming	15,000	
2024 Paris	Paris Aquatic Centre	Diving, Water polo	5,000	
2028 Los Angeles	A temporary pool at the Long Beach Convention Center Lot	Water Polo	tbc	
2032 Brisbane	Brisbane Aquatics Centre	Diving, Water polo	4,300	

== Gallery of venues ==
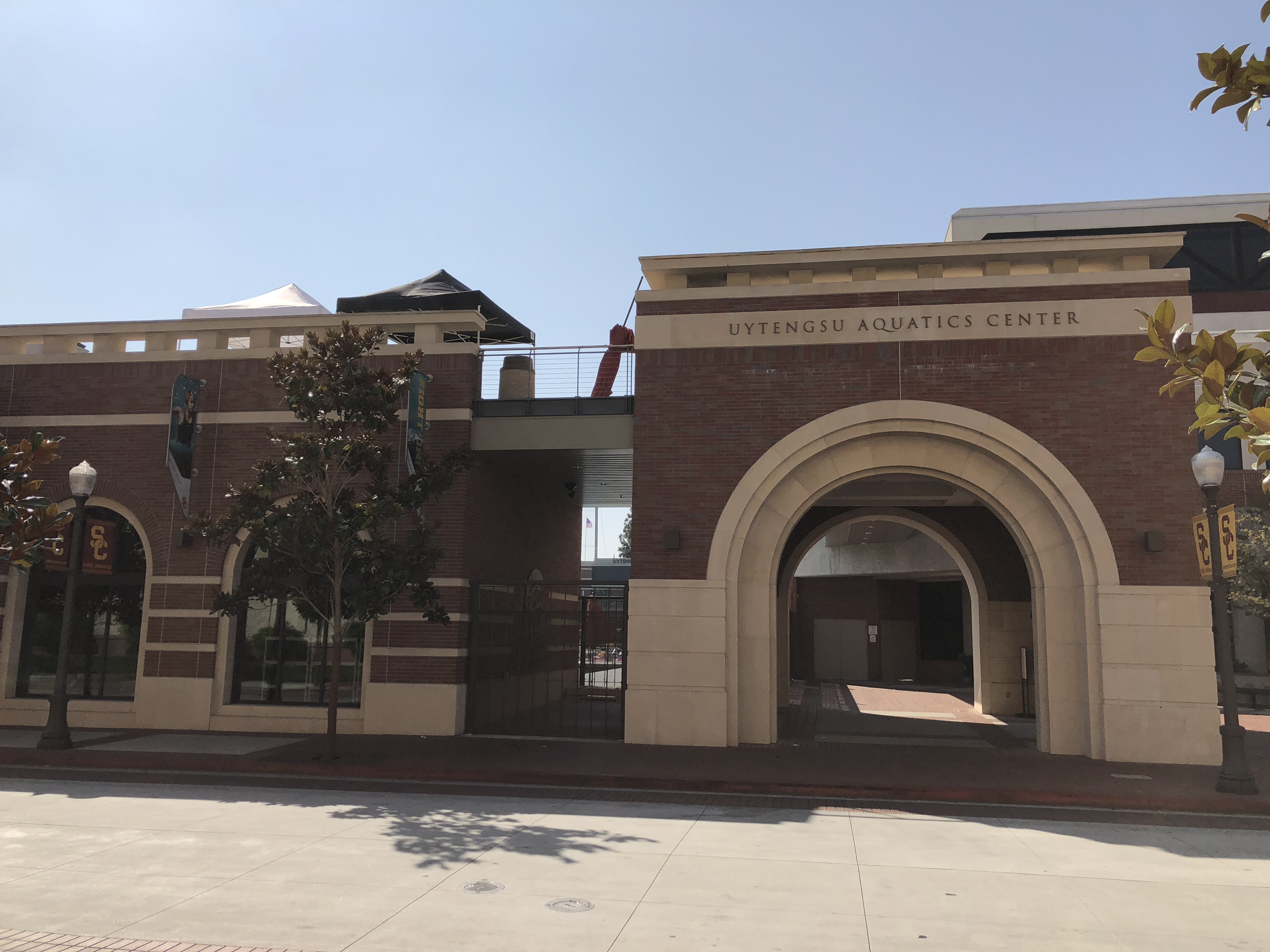
Uytengsu Aquatics Center hosted synchronized swimming at the 1984 Summer Olympics in Los Angeles

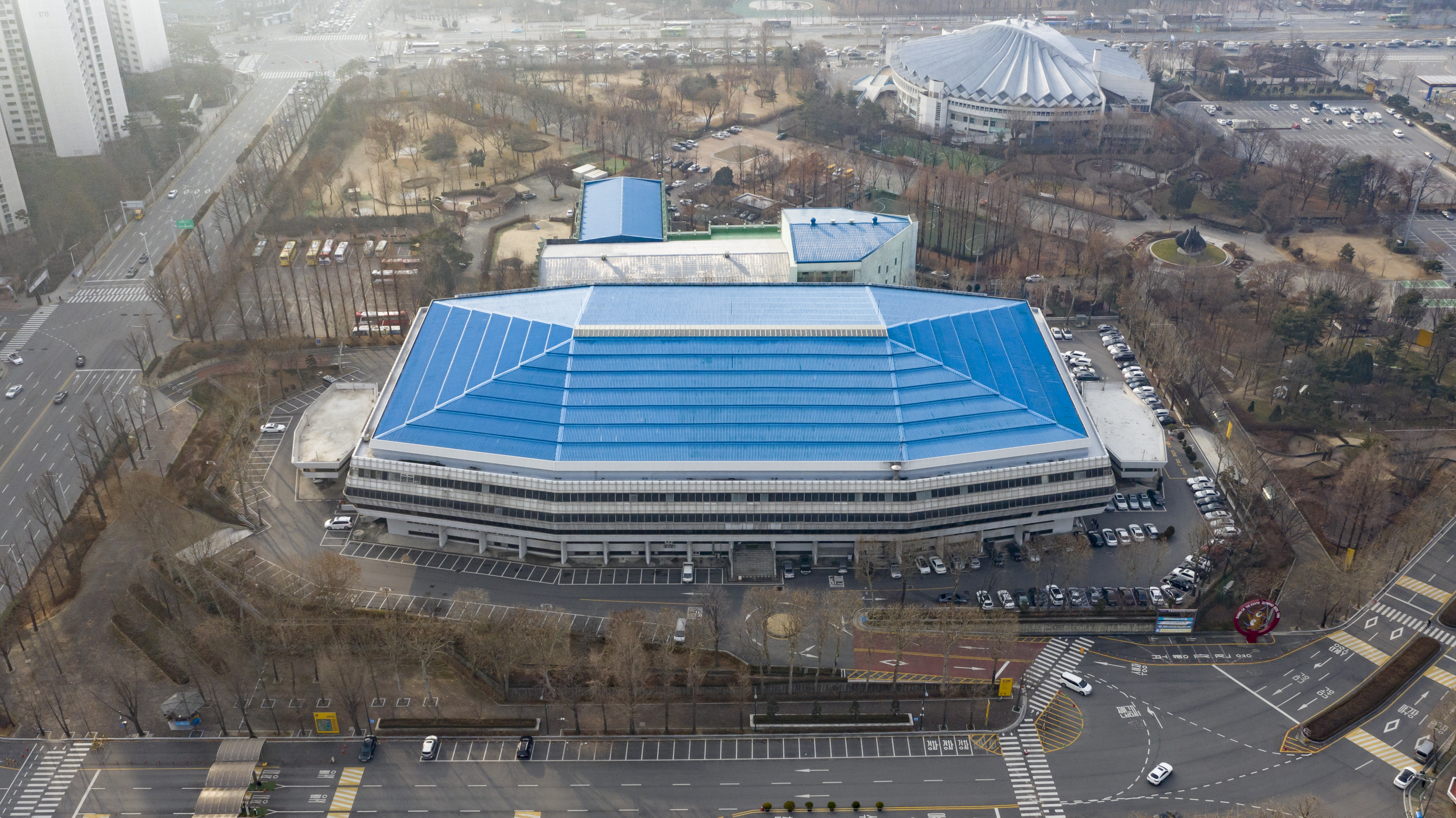
Jamsil Indoor Swimming Pool hosted synchronized swimming at the 1988 Summer Olympics in Seoul.

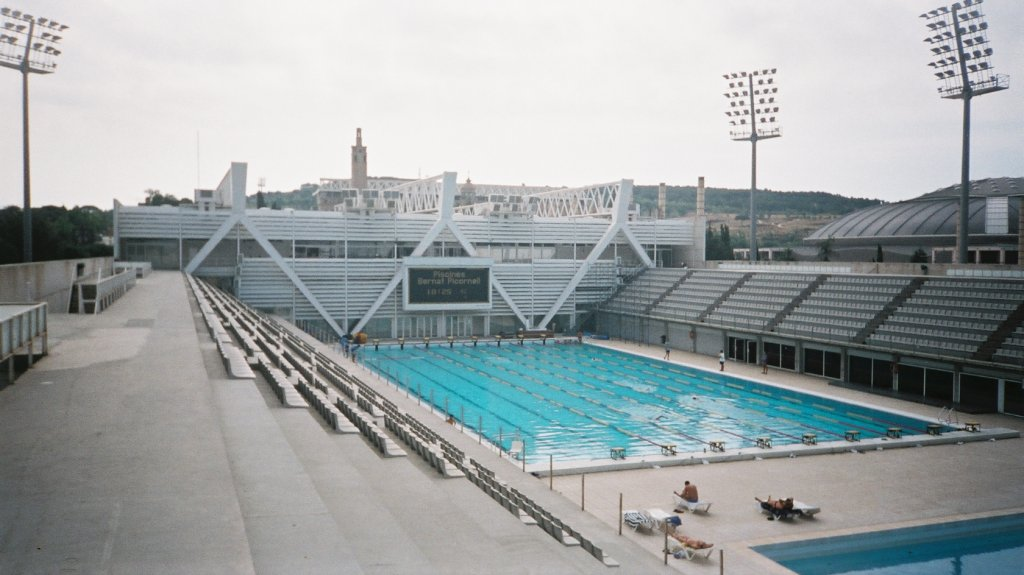
Piscines Bernat Picornell hosted synchronized swimming at the 1992 Summer Olympics in Barcelona.

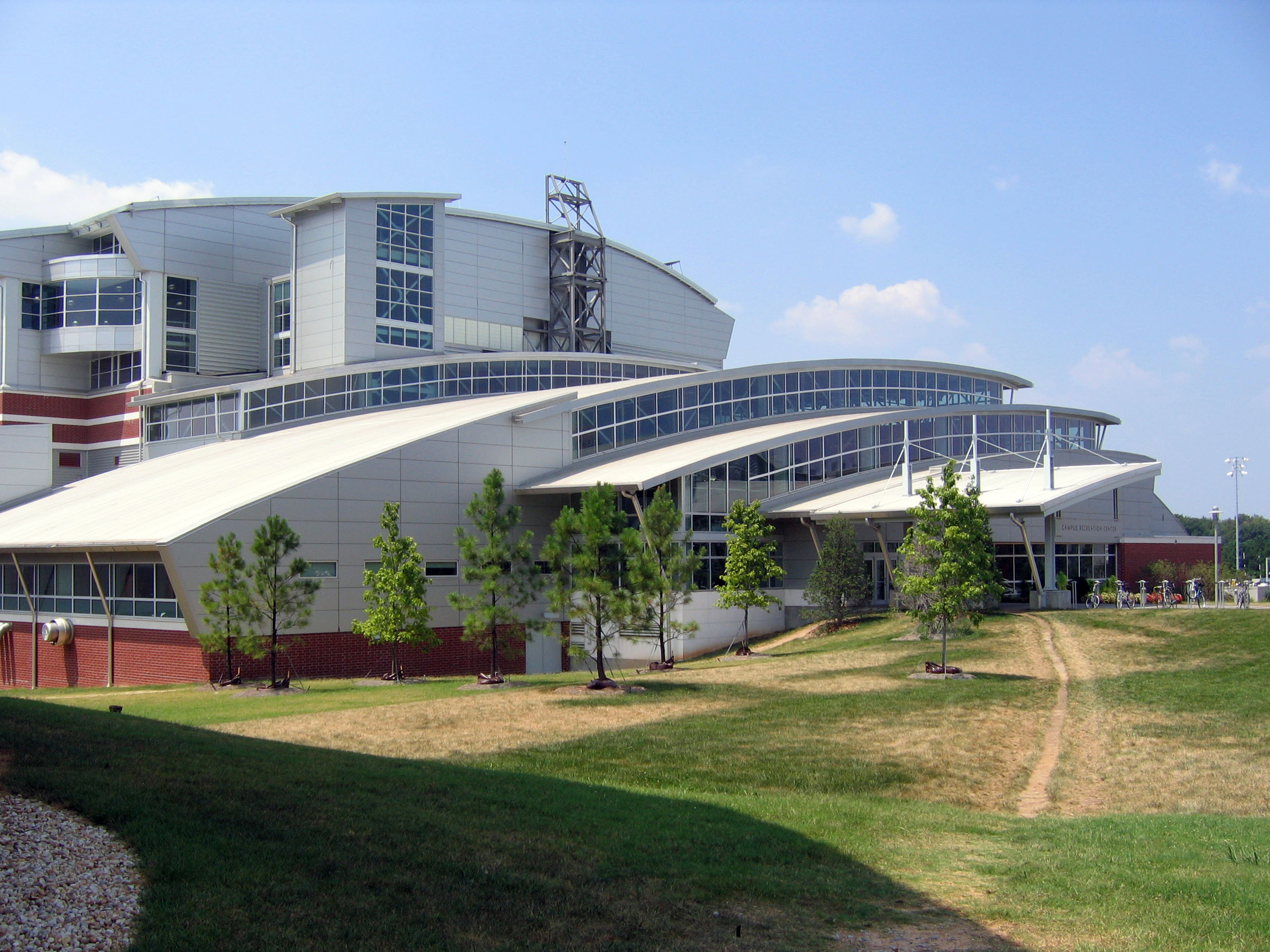
Georgia Tech Aquatic Center hosted the synchronized swimming at the 1996 Summer Olympics were in Atlanta.

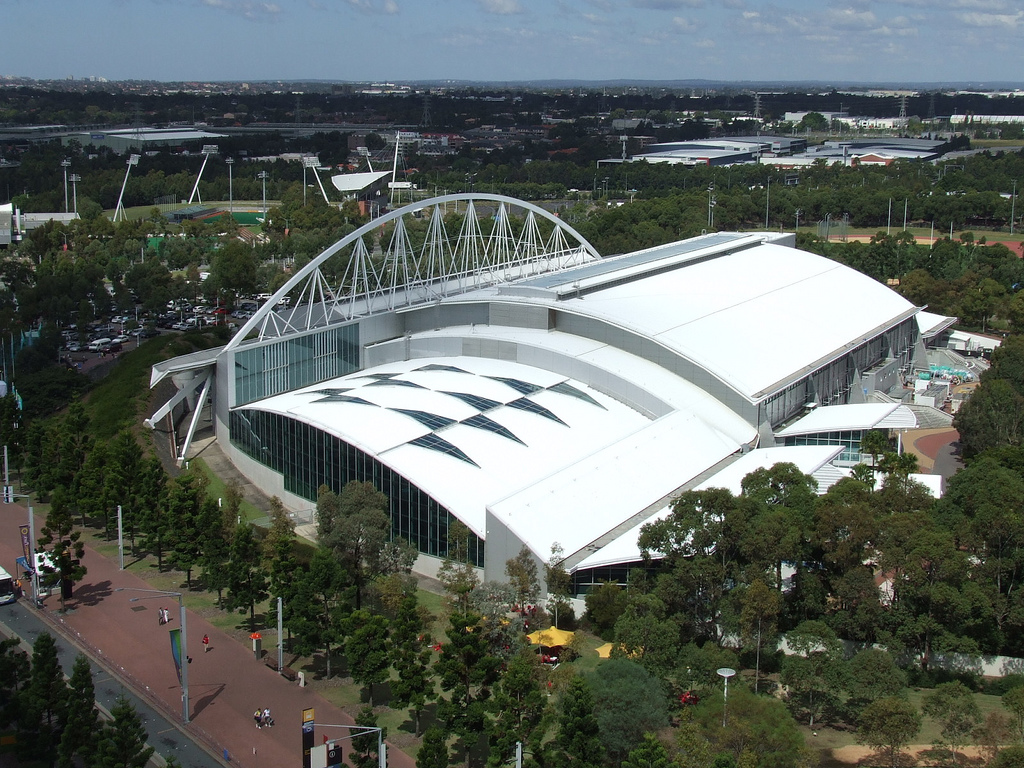
The Sydney Olympic Park Aquatics Centre hosted synchronized swimming at the 2000 Summer Olympics.

The Athens Olympic Aquatic Centre hosted synchronized swimming at the 2004 Summer Olympics in Athens.

The Beijing National Aquatics Centre hosted synchronized swimming at the 2008 Summer Olympics.

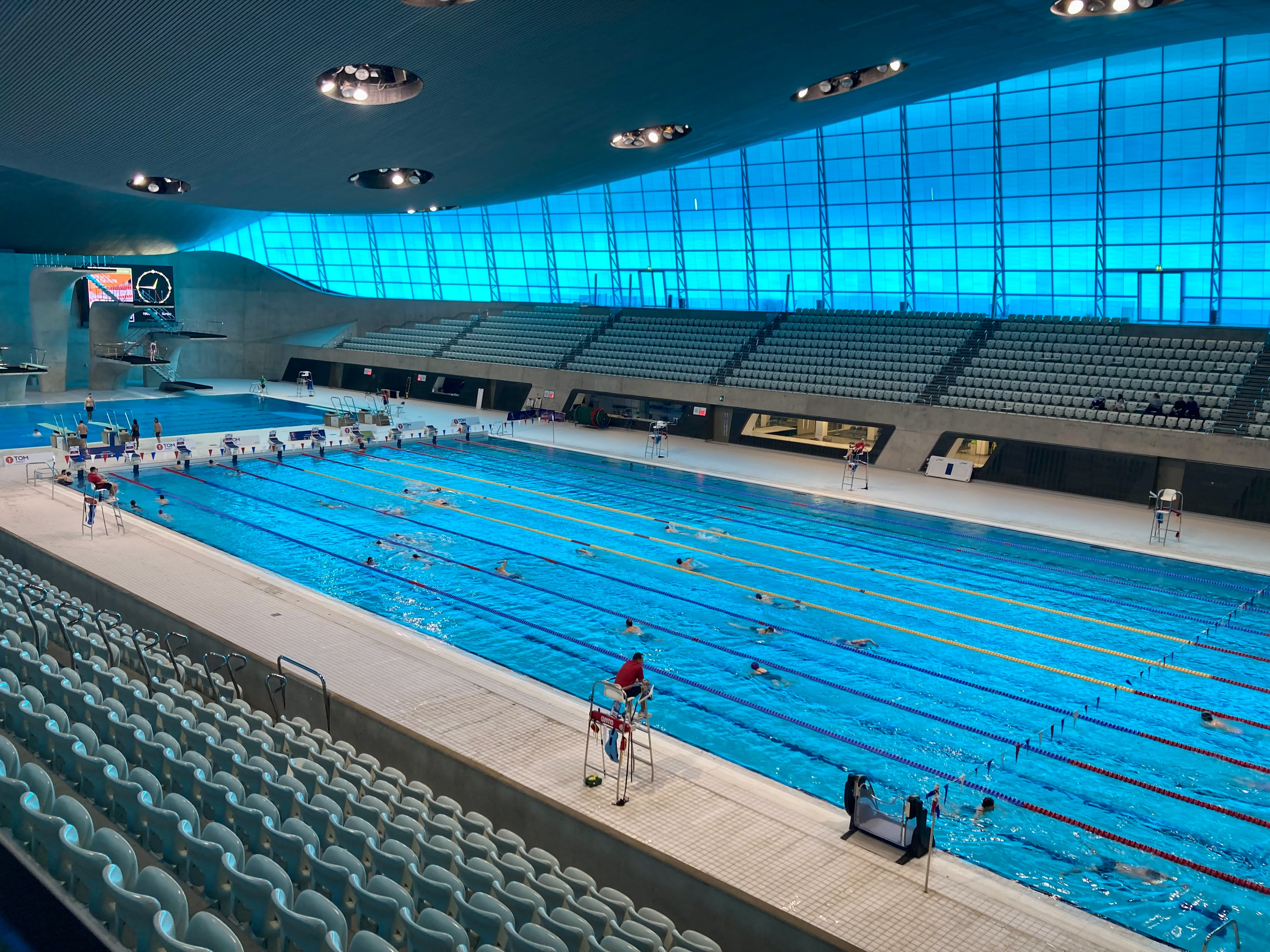
The London Aquatics Centre hosted synchronized swimming at the 2012 Summer Olympics.

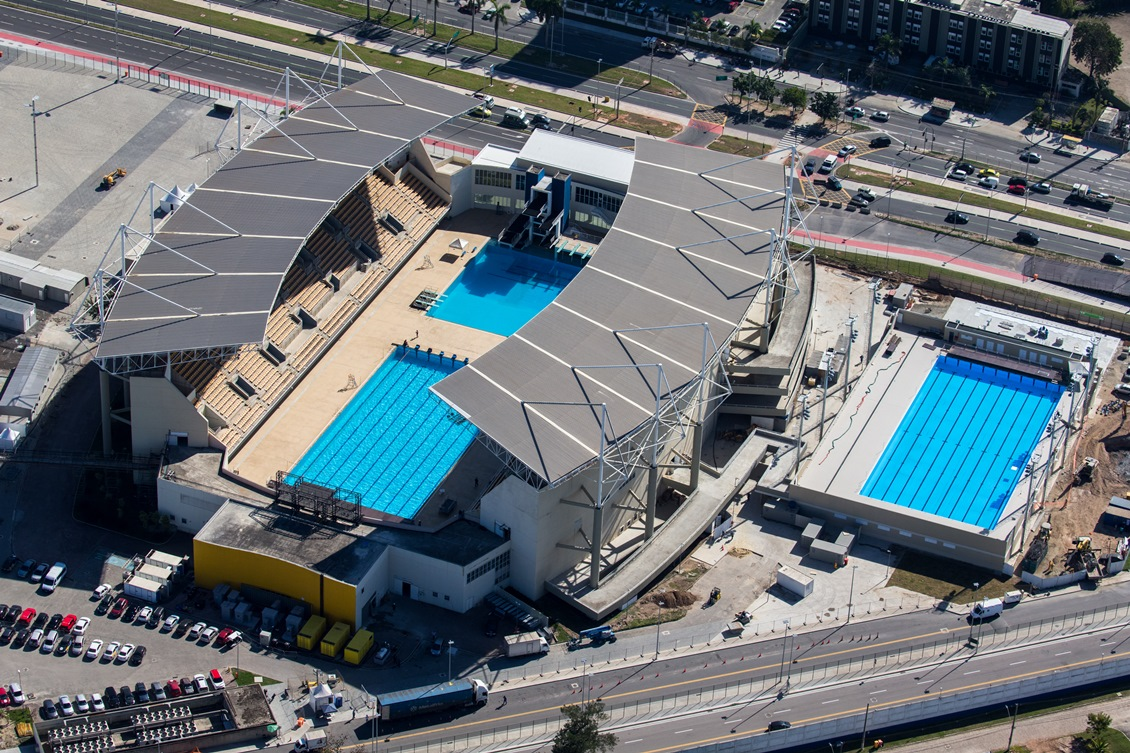
The Maria Lenk Aquatics Centre hosted synchronized swimming at the 2016 Summer Olympics in Rio de Janeiro.

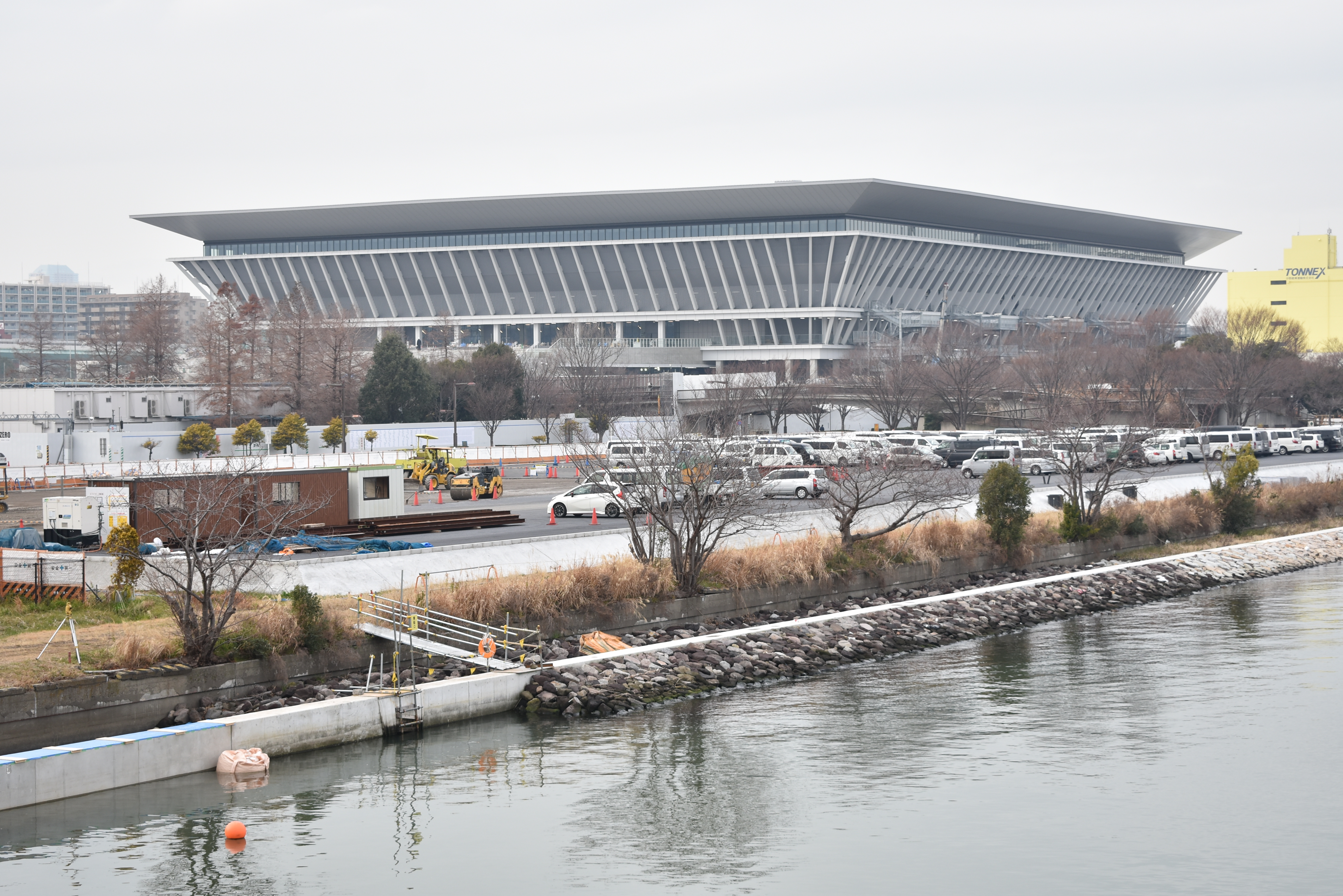
The Tokyo Aquatics Centre hosted artistic swimming at the 2020 Summer Olympics.

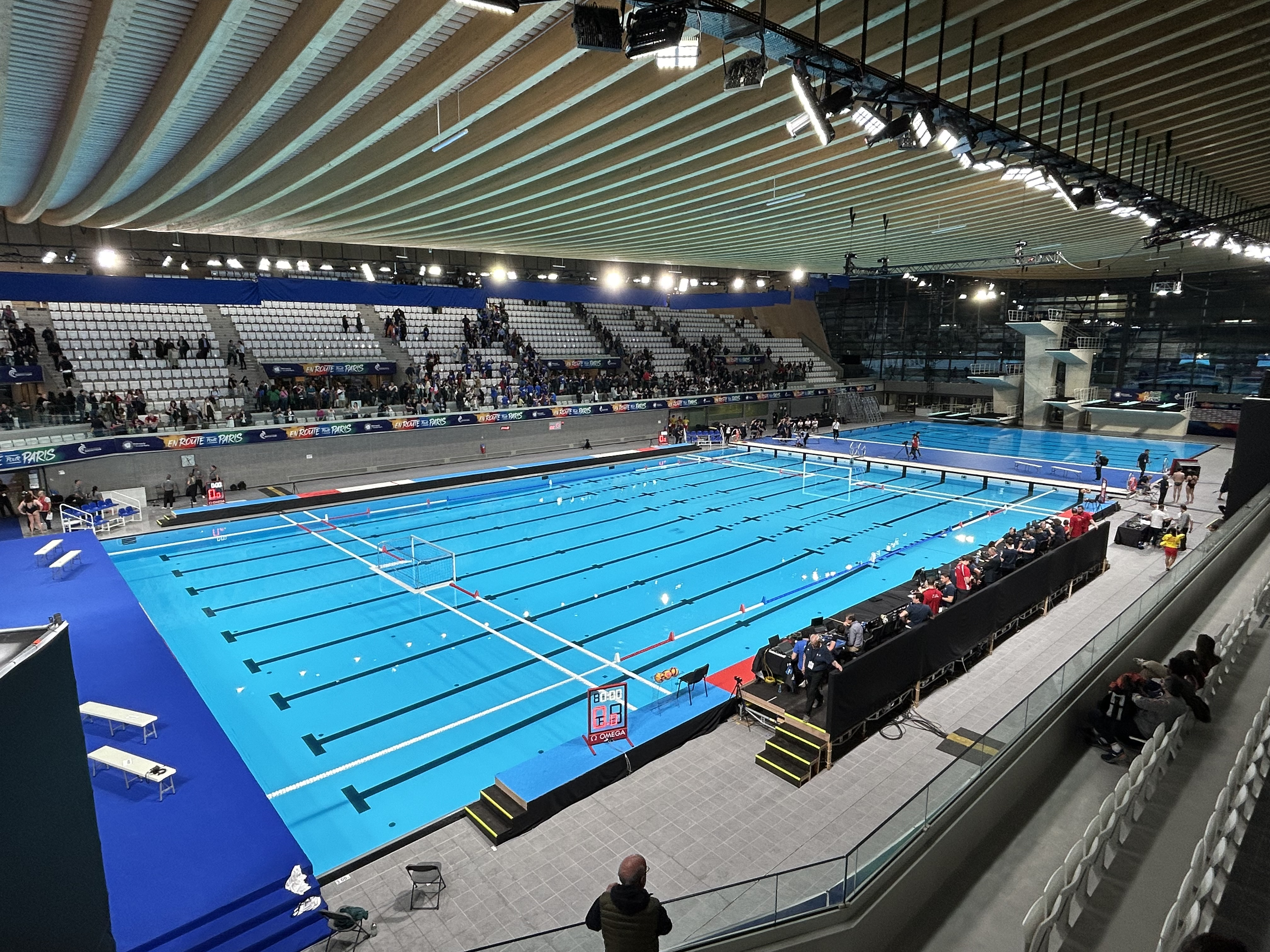
The Paris Aquatics Centre hosted artistic swimming at the 2024 Summer Olympics.

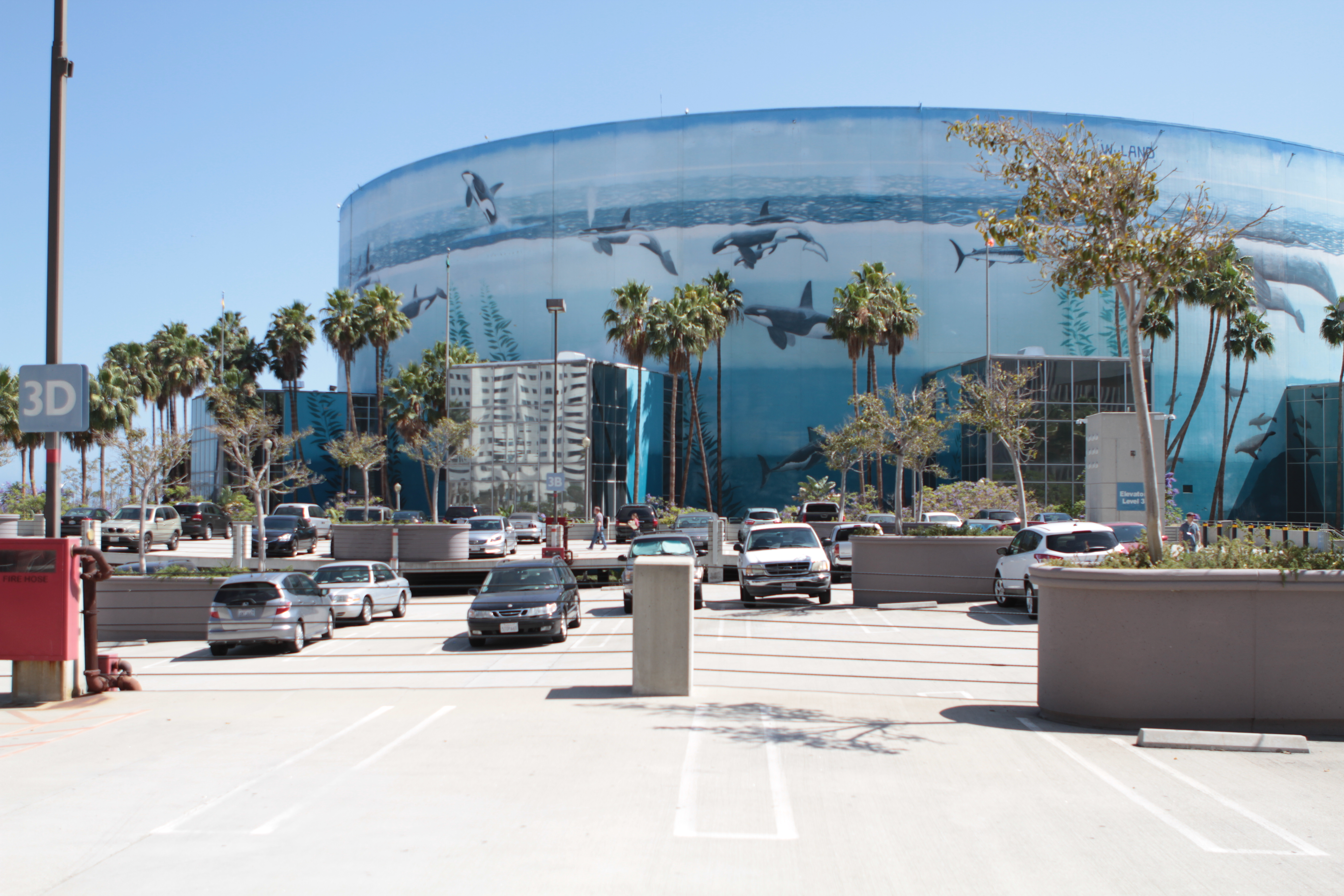
A temporary pool outside of the Long Beach Convention Center will host artistic swimming at the 2028 Summer Olympics in Los Angeles.
