= Colorado Memory Systems =

Defunct American technology company

Colorado Memory Systems, Inc.
- Company type: Subsidiary (1985–1990; 1992–1994); Private (1990–1992); Division (1994 – c. 1995)
- Industry: Technology
- Founded: 1985; 41 years ago in Loveland, Colorado, United States
- Founder: William "Bill" Beierwaltes
- Defunct: 1992; 34 years ago
- Fate: Acquired by Hewlett-Packard
- Products: Quarter-inch cartridge (QIC) drives and tapes
- Number of employees: 600 (1992, peak)
- Parent: Colorado Time Systems (1985–1990); Hewlett-Packard (1992 – c. 1995)

Colorado Memory Systems, Inc. (CMS), was an American technology company independently active from 1985 to 1992 and based in Loveland, Colorado. The company primarily manufactured tape drive systems, especially those using quarter-inch cartridges (QIC)s, for personal computers and workstations. Colorado Memory Systems was founded by Bill Beierwaltes as an offshoot of his previous company, Colorado Time Systems, also based in Loveland. It was acquired by Hewlett-Packard in 1992.

== History ==
=== Foundation and first products (1985–1988) ===
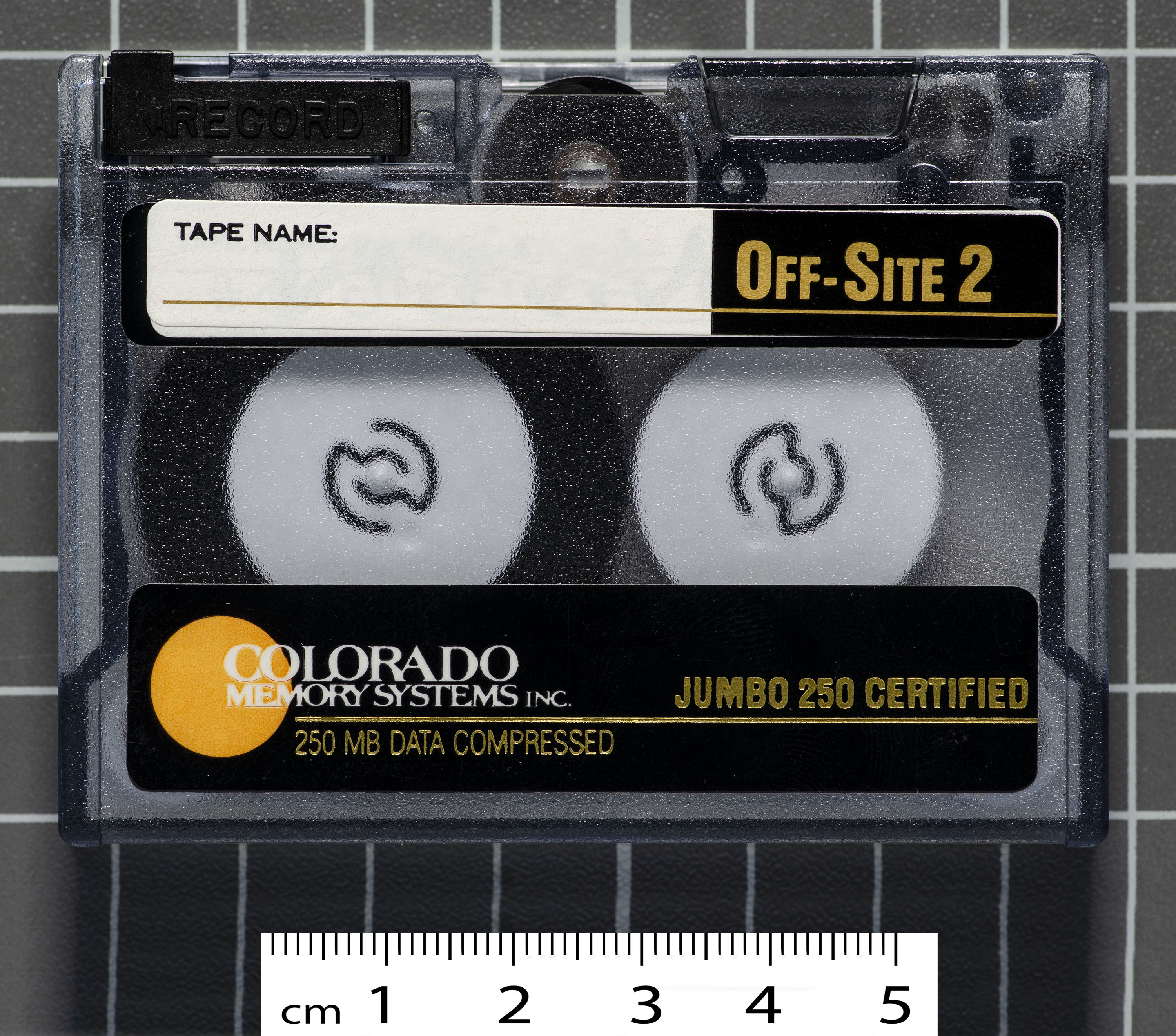
A Jumbo-branded quarter-inch cartridge (QIC) by Colorado Memory Systems

Colorado Memory Systems, Inc., was founded by William "Bill" Beierwaltes in Loveland, Colorado, in 1985, as a division of Colorado Time Systems, another Loveland-based company that he had previously founded in 1972. Whereas Colorado Time Systems focused on computerized timekeeping displays for athletics while also selling a broad range of other products, Beierwaltes founded Colorado Memory Systems chiefly to focus on data storage products for the burgeoning personal computer industry of the 1980s. Before founding Colorado Time Systems in 1972, Beierwaltes was a product manager for Hewlett-Packard from 1964 to 1974, working on the development and marketing for HP's electronic measuring equipment, especially its line of voltmeters.

In March 1985, CMS launched its first products, a line of 60-MB quarter-inch cartridge (QIC) drives manufactured by Rexon's WangTek division and rebadged as Tecmar products for redistribution by IBM. The drives made use of the then-ubiquitous QIC-24 tapes and came in three configurations: an external drive sporting only the QIC tape mechanism (QIC/60AT), another external drive comprising the QIC reader–writer and a 20-MB hard disk drive (QIC/60W20), and an internal drive and controller board (QIC/60H). These drives were the first tape backup products to be resold by IBM for its Personal Computer platform (by then also including the XT and AT). In August 1985, CMS collaborated again with Tecmar to release a bevy of peripherals for Commodore's new Amiga computer (specifically the premier Amiga 1000). These peripherals included a modem, a multifunction expansion module (including serial and parallel I/O, a real-time clock, and RAM), and a 20-MB external disk drive. These products were the first peripherals ever to be released for the Amiga.

=== Jumbo line (1988–1992) ===
CMS launched its first independently marketed products with the Jumbo line at the start of 1988. In 1989, they released a system in the Jumbo line, the QIC-150, that was the first to make use of Stac Electronics' Stacker compression algorithm in hardware. This allowed for a doubling of storage compared to contemporaneous QIC disk drives capacity without incurring a high performance penalty. The release of the QIC-150 shocked CMS' competitors such as Archive Corporation and Irwin Magnetics and upset the QIC Committee, a consortium of 35 companies who developed QIC hardware. The latter called for standardization in the use of such compression algorithms in hardware, as to ensure cross-compatibility between different manufacturers and to prevent unreadable backups when proprietary hardware becomes obsolete.

The company's Jumbo line eventually comprised the majority of the company's sales and was instrumental in its success into the early 1990s. By May 1990, Colorado Memory Systems had split from its parent company Colorado Time Systems while still operating out of Loveland. Their headquarters spanned 88,000 square feet and employed between 250 and 500 workers, each in disparate divisions, including management, manufacturing, and software development. By late 1992, the company employed 600.

=== Hewlett-Packard era (1992–1994) ===
Colorado Memory Systems announced its intention to make an initial public offering in June 1992. On the day before it was to go public, however, Hewlett-Packard (HP) announced its plans to acquire CMS in whole for an undisclosed amount in September 1992. CMS had posted profit of $2.6 million on sales of $131.5 million in the most recent financial quarter before its acquisition by HP. CMS remained an independently managed subsidiary of HP for a couple years, from November 1992 to November 1994, before its management was overtaken by HP and the subsidiary relegated to a division of HP. HP retained the Colorado Memory Systems name and Loveland headquarters for several years, until those headquarters were bought by Agilent Technologies, a spinoff of HP which acquired the latter's test equipment assets. Agilent eventually sold the building to the Thompson School District.

Disgruntled executives of CMS, unhappy with the acquisition by HP, founded ComByte, Inc., in 1993. Beierwaltes himself exited retirement after CMS' acquisition to found OneStep Software in 1997. In 1998, he became the CEO of OnStream, a spin-off of Philips dedicated to tape drives and other data storage devices.
