= Advanced Digital Recording =

Magnetic tape data storage format

Advanced Digital Recording (ADR) is a magnetic tape data storage format developed by OnStream from 1998 to 2003. Since the demise of OnStream, the format has been orphaned. ADR is an 8-track, linear tape format.

== Generations ==
Generation	ADR 30	ADR 50	ADR 2.60	ADR 2.120
Release date	1999	1999	2001	2001
Data Capacity	15 GB	25 GB	30 GB	60 GB
Transfer Rate (MB/s)	2	2	4	4
Tape Length (m)				

== Compatibility ==
The drive models for ADR 120 GB tapes can use both the ADR 60 GB and the ADR 120 GB tapes, while the 50 GB drives can use both ADR 30 GB and ADR 50 GB tapes.
