= ComByte =

ComByte, Inc.
- Type: Private
- Industry: Computer hardware
- Founded: 1993; 33 years ago in Fort Collins, Colorado, United States
- Founders: Edwin L. Harper; Michael L. Wash; John Moinester
- Defunct: March 1, 1996; 30 years ago
- Fate: Dissolution
- Products: Doubleplay
- Number of employees: 50 (1996, peak)

ComByte, Inc., was an American computer hardware company active from 1993 to 1996 and based in Fort Collins, Colorado. The company marketed the Doubleplay, a combination tape drive and 3.5-inch floppy drive that uses commodity QIC tapes while reading floppy disks twice as fast as standard floppy drives. The company's founders previously worked as executives for Colorado Memory Systems before that company was acquired by Hewlett-Packard in 1992. Doubleplay faltered in the market, and ComByte voluntarily dissolved in mid-1996.

== Foundation ==
ComByte, Inc., was founded in 1993 in Fort Collins, Colorado, by Edwin L. "Ed" Harper, Michael L. Wash, and John Moinester. All three co-founders had previously worked as executives for Colorado Memory Systems (CMS), a manufacturer of quarter-inch cartridge (QIC) tape drives based in nearby Loveland, Colorado. On the day before CMS was scheduled to go public on the stock market, Hewlett-Packard announced its acquisition of CMS in full, terminating the initial public offering. This came to Moinester and Harper's chagrin, with Harper recollecting: "We were both significantly disappointed. Our goal was to have a public company". Rather than work under the auspices of Hewlett-Packard, the two decided to form their own company with venture capital.

Moinester and Harper raised an undisclosed amount of start-up capital from Carman Ventures, a Boulder-based investment firm. The two spent its first year in stealth mode before announcing its first product, the Doubleplay, in October 1994, unveiling it to the public at COMDEX/Fall in Las Vegas the following month.

== Doubleplay ==
Doubleplay drive, internal model

The Doubleplay was a combination QIC tape drive and 3.5-inch floppy drive, available as both an external unit that connected to a PC via a parallel port connection; and as an internal unit that fit within a 5.25-inch drive bay. The Doubleplay uses commodity QIC tapes (chiefly the QIC-80 format) while reading floppy disks twice as fast as standard 3.5-inch floppy drives, up to 1 Mbit. The twofold increase in transfer rate over ordinary floppy drives stems from the floppy drive sharing the same motor as the tape drive's transport. By minimizing Doubleplay's total component count, ComByte's designers claimed they were able to market the drive below the cost of a floppy drive and tape drive, while also increasing the mean time between failures compared to using a floppy drive and a tape drive separately.

The QIC-80 tapes that the Doubleplay supports, meanwhile, can store up to 420 MB of data using 2:1 data compression. The Dataplay's floppy drive supports both double density and high density 3.5-inch floppy disks. The internal Doubleplay connects to a PC via a single ribbon cable to the floppy connector on the motherboard; alternatively, ComByte offered an accelerator card to which the Doubleplay connects, enhancing performance of the tape drive. The double-speed floppy drive feature requires a special device driver included on a floppy disk packaged with the Doubleplay.

== Collapse ==
The Doubleplay was slated for a January 1995 release, but production of the drive suffered from numerous setbacks. It was finally released in the first week of September 1995 through mail order and retailers. It received positive reviews in the national press. Computer Gaming World's Loyd Case wrote that the double-speed floppy drive "works like a charm", noting that the installation of games across multiple floppy disks "takes noticeably less time", albeit "it still seems like a long wait, because we've been spoiled by the quickness of CD installs". PC Magazine's Jamie M. Bsales recommended the internal unit, writing that "you get traditional tape storage, and you don't have to sacrifice a valuable bay or tolerate the painfully slow throughput of an external parallel-port drive".

The Doubleplay suffered from low adoption, however, owing to rapidly falling costs of QIC tape drives and floppy drives by the start of 1996. ComByte's management requested another round of investment from Carman Ventures in order to ramp up production of the Doubleplay to lower its sale price, but the latter were unwilling to flush ComByte with more capital, deeming the Doubleplay a failure. A principal at Carman reflected at the time: "It was not anticipated the bottom would fall out as precipitously as it did in terms of price". On March 1, 1996, by which point the company had 50 workers on its payroll, ComByte's board of directors petitioned to pull out Dataplay off the market and voluntarily dissolve the company. Immediately following ComByte's dissolution, Harper went on to become the president of SyQuest Technology, a manufacturer of cartridge disk drives based in Silicon Valley.
