= Scalable Linear Recording =

Magnetic tape data storage format

Scalable Linear Recording is the name used by Tandberg Data for its line of QIC based tape drives.

The earliest SLR drive, the SLR1, has a capacity of 250 MB, while the latest drive, the SLR140, has a capacity of 70 GB. The term SLR is often used to refer to QIC tapes, as for many years they were the only drives that used them before Tandberg discontinued production around 2015.

== Generations ==
=== Quarter inch formats ===
Generation	SLR1	SLR2	SLR3	SLR4	SLR4-DC	SLR5	SLR24 SLR6	SLR32 MLR1	SLR50 MLR3
Release date	1986	1988	1990	1992		1997		1996	1997
Data Capacity	250 MB	525 MB	1 GB	2.5 GB		4 GB	12 GB	16 GB	20 GB
Transfer Rate (kB/s)	84.8	199	197	296	280	387	1200	1500	2000
Tape Length (m)	311					457		457	462

NOTE: MLR stands for Multi-channel Linear Recording.

=== Eight millimeter formats ===
Generation	SLR7	SLR40	SLR60	SLR75	SLR100	SLR140	SLR200	SLR400
Release date	1997					2003	TBA	TBA
Data Capacity	20 GB	20 GB	30 GB	38 GB	50 GB	70 GB	100 GB	200 GB
Transfer Rate (kB/s)	3000	2500	4000	4300	5000	6000	16000	32000
Tape Length (m)	470.9	187.5	278.9	350.5	457.2	505.9		
