= OnStream =

Dutch magnetic tape storage company

OnStream Holdings, Inc.
- Type: Private
- Founded: 1998; 28 years ago in the Netherlands
- Founder: William B. Beierwaltes
- Defunct: 2003; 23 years ago
- Fate: Bankruptcy
- Website: onstream.com at the Wayback Machine (archived 1999-02-08)

OnStream Holdings, Inc., was a Dutch computer hardware company that manufactured magnetic tape data storage products. The company was a spin-off of Philips established in 1998 and went bankrupt in both 2001 and 2003.

As a result of its first bankruptcy in 2001, the company was split into two parts, OnStream Data and OnStream MST. The "Data" division manufactured magnetic tape products and the "MST" division produced the thin film tape heads. MST also produced microsieves and microelectromechanical systems products. After the second OnStream bankruptcy in 2003, the MST division was reborn as fluXXion, a maker of high-tech filtering products. fluXXion had some success in filtering beer and other food products but went bankrupt in 2011.

Prior to the first bankruptcy, the CEO was William B. Beierwaltes, a tape systems pioneer and founder of Colorado Memory Systems.

The company's magnetic tape data storage technology was called Advanced Digital Recording (ADR). Tape drives based on this technology were relatively high in data capacity and low in price.
