= Aquatic timing system =

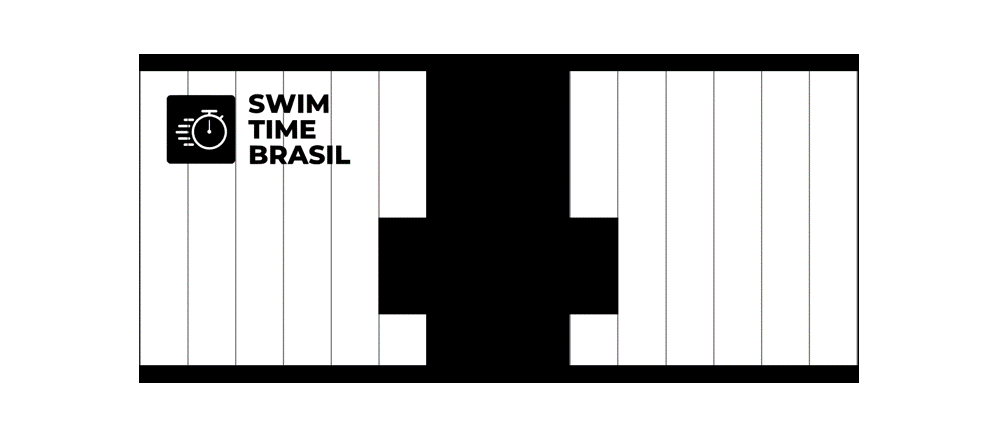
Touchpad used in swimming timing systems.

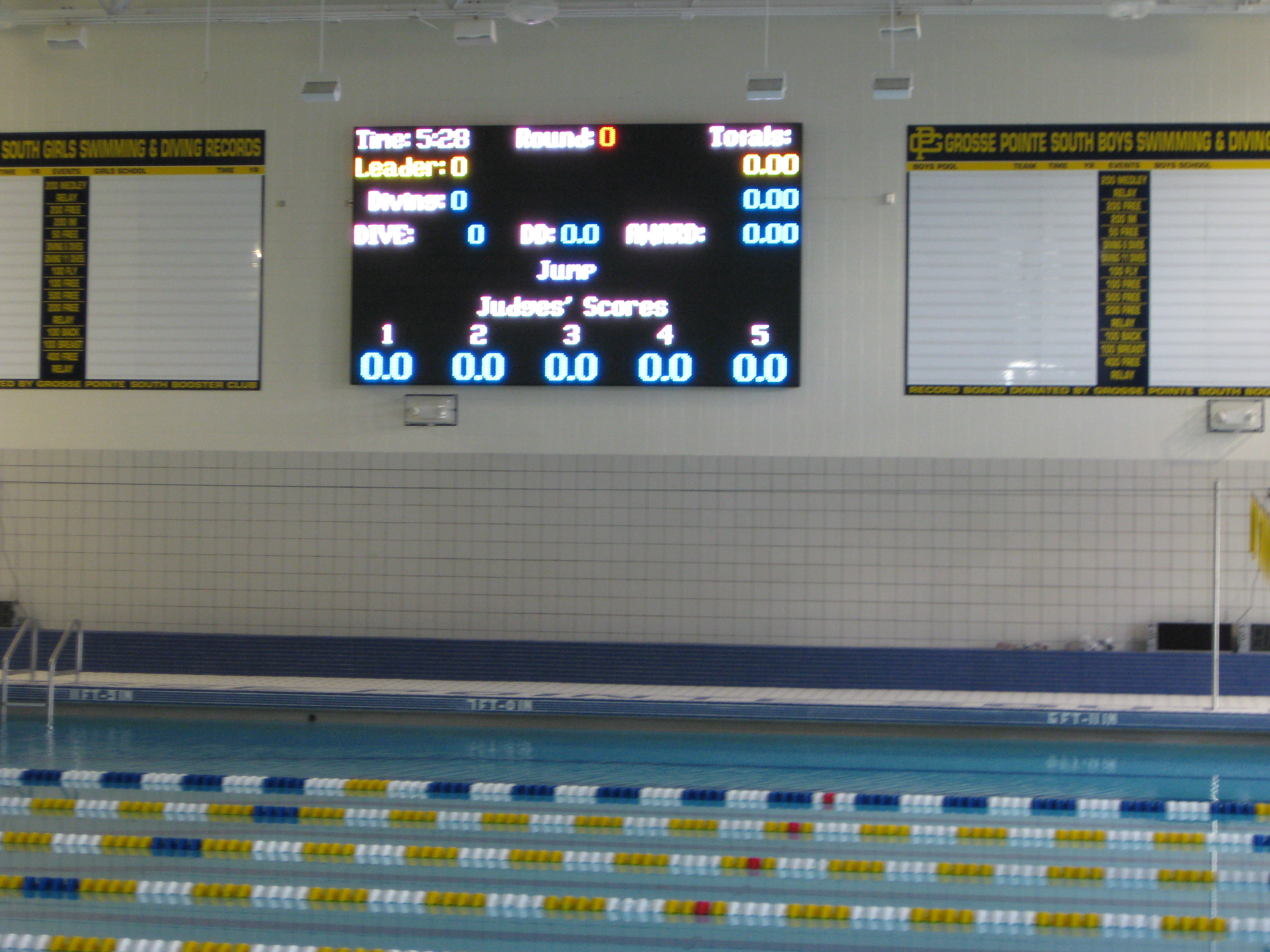
Diving Template.

Aquatic timing systems are designed to automate the process of timing, judging, and scoring in competitive swimming and other aquatic sports, including diving, water polo, and synchronized swimming. These systems are also used in the training of athletes, and many add-on products have been developed to assist with this process. Some aquatic timing systems manufacturers include Colorado Time Systems, Swiss Timing (Omega), Daktronics and Seiko.

== History ==
Prior to the 1950s, competitive swimmers relied on the sound of a starting pistol to start their races and mechanical stopwatches to record their times at the end of a race. A limitation of analog timekeeping was the technology's inability to reliably record times accurately below one tenth (0.1) of a second. In 1967, the Omega company of Switzerland developed the first electronic timing system for swimming that attempted to coordinate the physical the recorded time. This new system placed contact pads (known as Touchpad) in each lane of the pool, calibrated in such a fashion that the incidental water movement of the competitors or wave action did not trigger the pad sensors; the pad was only activated by the touch of the swimmer at the end of the race.

== Meet Manager Programs ==
Meet Managers are programs created to automate the process of generating results and can be either downloadable or web applications. They are normally sold to clubs and can also be connected to the timing system to obtain timing information automatically. Some meet manager developers include Active Hy-Tek, Splash Software, SwimTopia, NBC Sports and Bigmidia.

== See also ==
- Scoreboard
- Fully automatic time
