= Quarter-inch cartridge =

Magnetic tape data storage format

Quarter Inch Cartridge

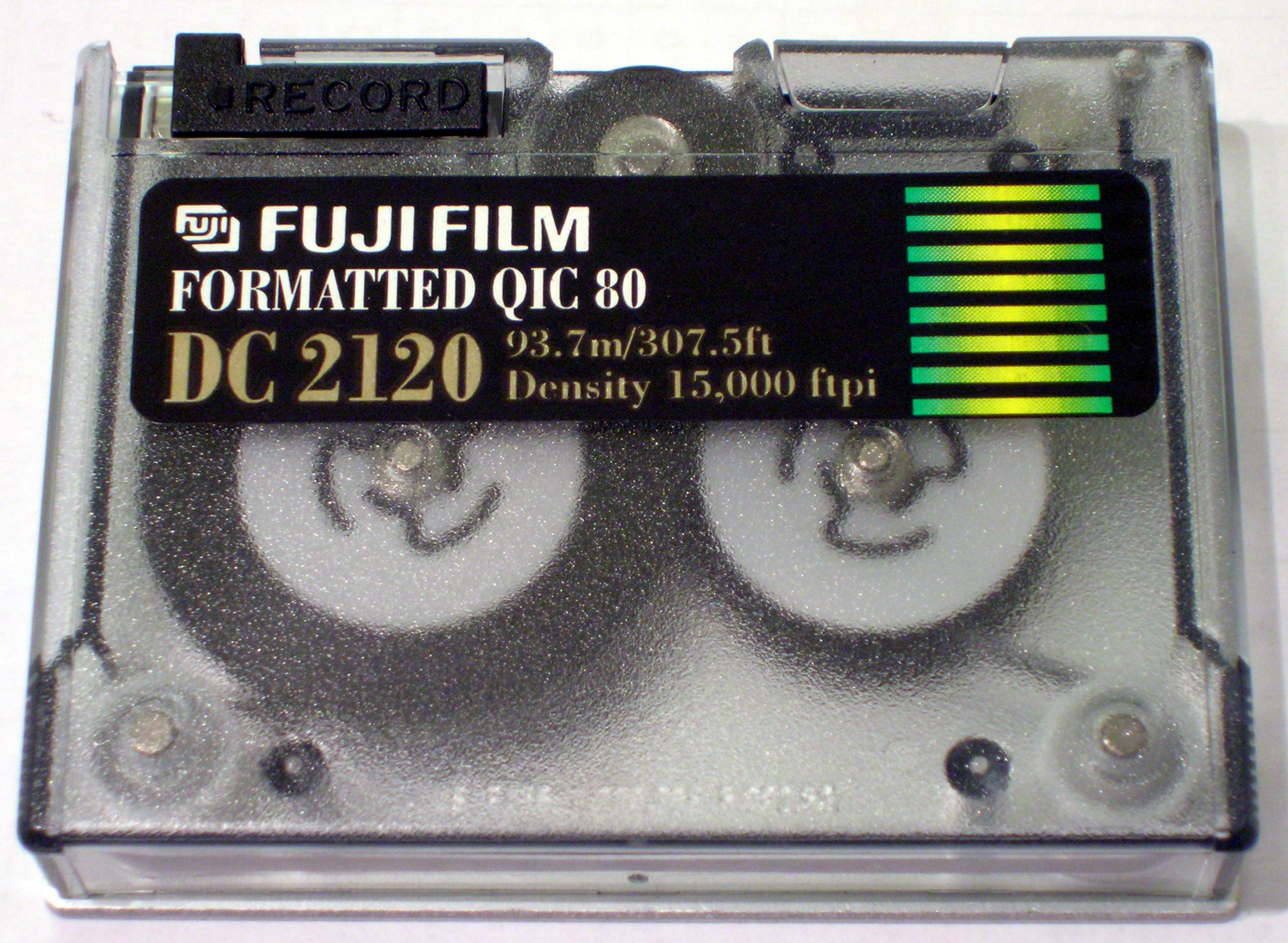
- A common example of a QIC-80 tape
- Media type: magnetic tape
- Encoding: MFM, RLL
- Capacity: 20/40/80MB and more, with 2:1 compression being a common benchmark
- Standard: QIC-80, QIC-117
- Developed by: 3M
- Usage: Computer backup, data transfer
- Extended to: Travan

Quarter inch cartridge tape (abbreviated QIC, commonly pronounced "quick") is a magnetic tape data storage format introduced by 3M in 1972, with derivatives still in use as of 2016. QIC comes in a rugged enclosed package of aluminum and plastic that holds two tape reels driven by a single belt in direct contact with the tape. The tape was originally 1/4 inch (6.35 mm) wide and anywhere from 300 to 1,500 feet (91 to 457 m) long. Data is written linearly along the length of the tape in one track (mostly on pre-1980 equipment), or written "serpentine", one track at a time, the drive reversing direction at the end of the tape, and each track's data written in the opposite direction to its neighbor. Since its introduction, it has been widely used, and many variations exist. There is a QIC trade association that publishes QIC standards which include interfaces and logical formats. To a very large extent it was the efficiency and openness of this organization which encouraged hardware and software developers to use this type of drive and media.

== Features of QIC ==
The QIC is distinguished from other types of tape cartridges by containing an endless drive belt which is moved at a uniform speed by a motorised capstan. Since the belt is in contact with the tape, this ensures both that the tape moves at uniform speed, and that neutral tension is maintained at all times. This is in contrast to cassette tapes or DATs, where the tape is moved past the head by a capstan and pinch wheel, but the take-up reel is driven by a servo motor or slipping clutch.

The tape in a QIC is not physically attached to the reels and is never completely unwound. This is again different from other cassettes or cartridges, which generally have some form of clip anchoring on at least one end of the tape. To ensure that the tape is never completely unwound, each end has a small beginning or end of tape hole which is detected by an optical sensor, and an "early warning" hole further from each end. If a defective drive—for example with fluff in a sensor—winds the tape past the BOT or EOT marker, the tape will detach from the spool and the cartridge will be unusable unless it is reattached.

The design of the tape cartridge is very robust: the aluminum baseplate is 1/10 inch (2.54 mm) thick, and the robust plastic cover can withstand abuse and impacts that would damage other tape formats.

However, because the tape is belt-driven, seeking back and forth can eventually cause the tape to become unevenly tensioned. It is therefore necessary to periodically re-tension the cartridge. This is accomplished by winding the tape from beginning to end and back in one operation, allowing the belt to equalize itself. For newer QIC drives that use a SCSI interface, there is a SCSI "RETENSION" command to do this.

When the cartridge gets old, the belt may not provide enough friction to turn the take-up spool smoothly. When this happens, the belt will need to be replaced.

In some cases a cartridge must be formatted before use. The capability to do this is in the drive rather than the host computer.

== Generations ==
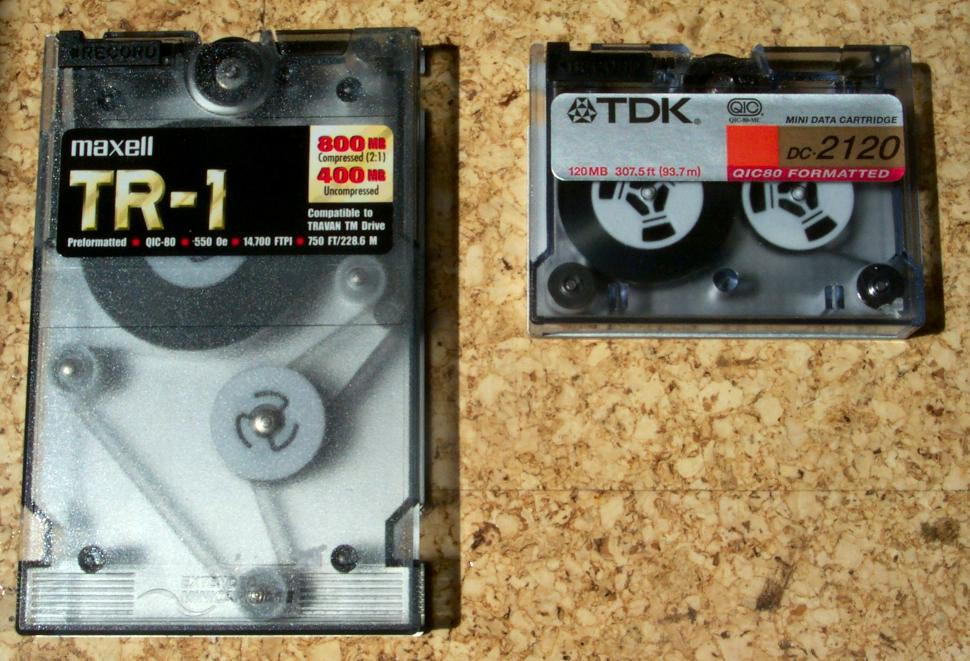
Quarter inch cartridges: left, 400MB (QIC-EX); right, 120MB (QIC-80)

=== 3M Data Cartridge (DC) ===
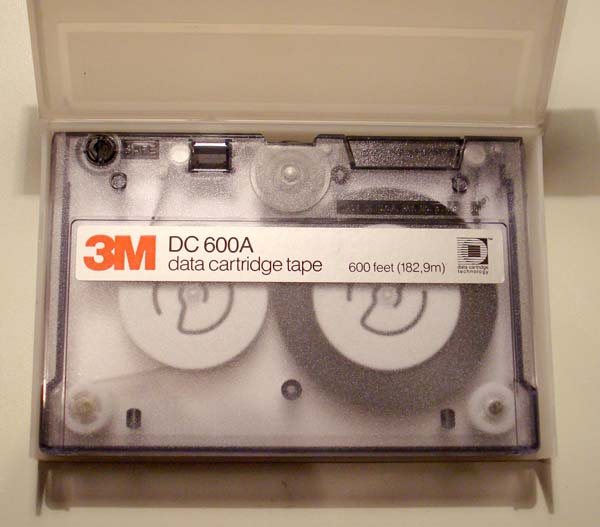
QIC DC 600A cassette

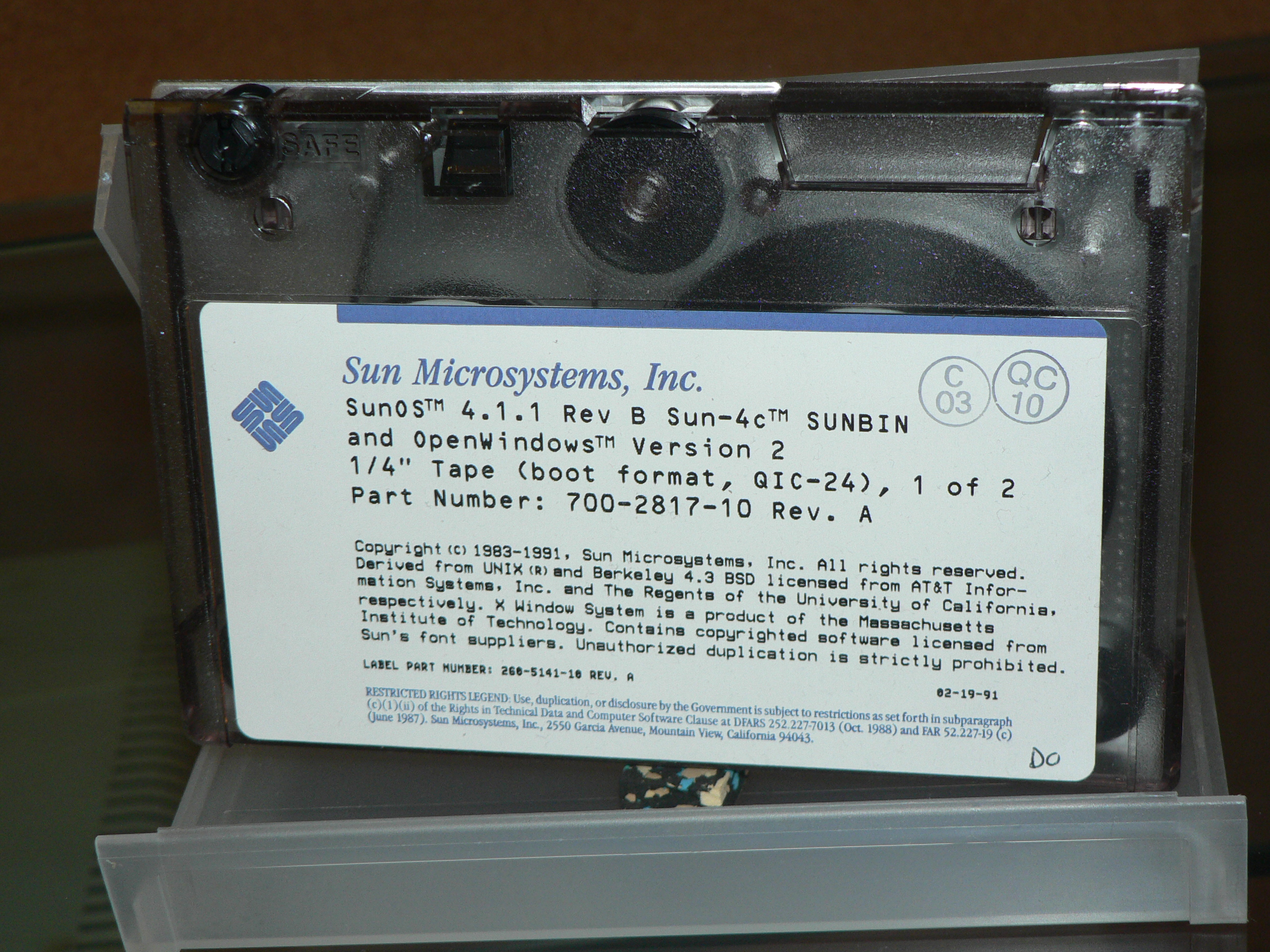
SunOS 4.1.1 QIC-24 tape

The QIC format was introduced by 3M in 1972. The first QIC tape format was the 5 7/8 inches (150 mm) by 3 7/8 inches (98 mm) Data Cartridge (DC) format with two internal belt-driven reels and a metal base. The original product, the DC300, has 300 feet of tape and holds 200 kilobytes. Various QIC DC recording formats have appeared over the years, including:

- QIC-11: a four-track format giving 20 MB on a 450 ft DC300XL cartridge
- QIC-24: nine-track, 45 MB or 60 MB on a 450 or 600 ft DC600A cartridge, respectively
- QIC-120: 15-track, 125 MB, DC6150 cartridge
- QIC-150: 18-track, 150 MB, DC6150 cartridge
- QIC-525: 26-track, 525 MB on a 1020 ft DC6525 cartridge
- QIC-1350: 30-track, 1.35 GB on a DC9135 cartridge

Other QIC DC standards include the QIC-02 and QIC-36 drive interface standards. Later QIC DC drives usually use the QIC-104/111 SCSI and QIC-121 SCSI-2 interfaces.

Other Data Cartridge (DC) look-alikes:

- 3M DC600HC, a preformatted tape with 16 tracks on 600 foot DC600A and software-based EOT/BOT detection. HP used these in the HP914x type of cartridge drives.

=== QIC Mini Cartridge (MC) ===
Later, the smaller Minicartridge (MC) form-factor was introduced. This is 2 3/8 inches (60 mm) by 3 1/8 inches (79 mm) size and is small enough to fit in a 3 1/2-inch (90 mm) drive bay.

- QIC-40
  - 20-track DC2000 mini-cartridge 205 ft. 40 MB
  - 20-track DC2000XL mini-cartridge 307½ ft. 60 MB
- QIC-80
  - 28-track DC2080 mini-cartridge 205 ft. 80 MB
  - 28-track DC2120 mini-cartridge 307½ ft. 120 MB

=== Travan (TR) ===
40GB Travan tape cartridge

Travan is an evolution of the QIC Minicartridge format, sold for personal computer use. This version, developed by 3M, uses a longer and wider (8 mm) tape to give higher capacities.

Format	Capacity (MB)	Speed (kB/s)	Tracks
QIC-80	80-500	62.5	28/36
TR-1	400	62.5	36
TR-1EX	500	62.5	36
QIC-3010	340	62.5	40/50
TR-2	800	62.5	50
QIC-3020	670	62.5	40/50
TR-3	1,600	125	50
TR-3EX	2,200	125	50
QIC-3080	1,200-1,600	125	60/72
TR-4	4,000	1024	72
QIC-3095	4,000	1024	72
TR-5	10,000	1024	108

=== SLR ===
SLR is Tandberg Data's name for its line of high-capacity QIC data cartridge drives. As of 2005, Tandberg was the only manufacturer of SLR/QIC drives in the world. The largest SLR drive can hold 70 GB of data (140 GB compressed).

=== QIC-Wide ===
A variant from Sony using a wider .315 inch (8 mm) tape and increases the recording density. QIC-Wide drives are backwards compatible with QIC tapes.

=== QIC-EX ===
QIC Extra, a modification to support longer tapes and thus more data by the Verbatim Corporation, was made possible by making the cartridges physically longer to accommodate larger spools. In many cases a standard QIC drive and backup package can use the extended length to store additional data, however in some cases an attempt to reformat a QIC-EX cartridge fails since the time taken to traverse the extra length triggers a timeout in the drive or controlling software intended to detect a broken tape.

== Computer interfaces ==
=== QIC-02 ===
QIC-02 ("1/4 inch Cartridge Tape Drive Intelligent Interface Standard") defines a standard interface for 1/4in cartridges, with 8-bit+1 parity bidirectional data channel with control signals on a 50-pin connector, as well as a standard command interface between the host and tape drive.

=== QIC-117 ===
QIC-117 ("Command Set Interface Specification for Flexible Disk Controller Based Mini Data Cartridge Tape Drives") defines a method of using the Floppy disk controller in an IBM PC to control tape drives. QIC-117 borrows the Index, Track Zero, and Step lines on the controller to send commands and retrieve responses from the drive. The QIC-40 and QIC-80 cartridges were designed to take advantage of existing MFM or RLL encoding and decoding logic.

=== QIC-157 ===
An interface standard for tape drives using the ATAPI (IDE) and SCSI interfaces.

== See also ==
- Apple Tape Backup 40SC
- Colorado Memory Systems, a company dedicated to QIC, later acquired by Hewlett-Packard
