= List of Olympic venues in swimming =

For the Summer Olympics there are 31 venues that have been or will be used for swimming. The first venue took place in The Bay of Zea for the 1896 Games. Four years later, the events took place on the River Seine. They were part of events that were on the same venue as the 1904 Louisiana Purchase Exposition. By the 1908 Games, the first venue for swimming that was not in a lake or a river took place. It was not until 1920 Games that a separate venue was created for the aquatic events. The first venue where indoor swimming took place was after World War II at London in 1948.

Games	Venue	Other sports hosted at venue for those games	Type	Capacity	Ref.
1896 Athens	Bay of Zea	None	Bay	Not listed.	
1900 Paris	Seine	Rowing, Water polo	River	Not listed.	
1904 St. Louis	Forest Park	Diving, Water Polo	Artificial lake	Not listed.	
1908 London	White City Stadium	Archery, Athletics, Cycling (track), Diving, Field hockey, Football, Gymnastics, Lacrosse, Rugby union, Tug of war, Water polo (final), Wrestling	Outdoor pool	97,000.	
1912 Stockholm	Djurgårdsbrunnsviken	Diving, Modern pentathlon (swimming), Rowing, Water polo	Outdoor pool	Not listed.	
1920 Antwerp	Stade Nautique d'Antwerp	Diving, Water polo	Outdoor pool	Not listed.	
1924 Paris	Piscine des Tourelles	Diving, Modern pentathlon (swimming), Water polo	Outdoor pool	8,023	
1928 Amsterdam	Olympic Sports Park Swim Stadium	Diving, Modern pentathlon (swimming), Water polo	Outdoor pool	4,440	
1932 Los Angeles	Swimming Stadium	Diving, Modern pentathlon (swimming), Water polo	Outdoor pool	10000	
1936 Berlin	Olympic Swimming Stadium	Diving, Modern pentathlon (swimming), Water polo	Outdoor pool	20,000.	
1948 London	Empire Pool	Boxing, Diving, Water polo (final)	Indoor pool	12,500	
1952 Helsinki	Swimming Stadium	Diving, Water polo	Outdoor pool	12,500	
1956 Melbourne	Swimming/Diving Stadium	Diving, Modern pentathlon (swimming), Water polo	Indoor pool	6,000	
1960 Rome	Stadio Olimpico del Nuoto	Diving, Modern pentathlon (swimming), Water polo (final)	Outdoor pool	20,000	
1964 Tokyo	Yoyogi National Gymnasium	Basketball (final), Diving, Modern pentathlon (swimming)	Indoor pool	4,000 (basketball); 11,300 (diving, swimming)	
1968 Mexico City	Francisco Márquez Olympic Pool	Diving, Modern pentathlon (swimming), Water polo (final)	Indoor pool	15,000	
1972 Munich	Schwimmhalle	Diving, Modern pentathlon (swimming), Water polo (final)	Indoor pool	9,182	
1976 Montreal	Olympic Pool	Diving, Modern pentathlon (swimming), Water polo (final)	Indoor pool	10,000	
1980 Moscow	Swimming Pool - Olimpisky	Diving, Modern pentathlon (swimming), Water polo (final)	Indoor pool	13,000	
1984 Los Angeles	Olympic Swim Stadium	Diving, Synchronized swimming	Outdoor pool	16,500	
1988 Seoul	Jamsil Indoor Swimming Pool	Diving, Modern pentathlon (swimming), Synchronized swimming, Water polo	Indoor pool	8,000	
1992 Barcelona	Piscines Bernat Picornell	Modern pentathlon (swimming), Synchronized swimming, Water polo (final)	Outdoor pool	10,000	
1996 Atlanta	Georgia Tech Aquatic Center	Diving, Modern pentathlon (swimming), Synchronized swimming, Water polo	Indoor pool	15,000	
2000 Sydney	Sydney International Aquatic Centre	Diving, Modern pentathlon (swimming), Synchronized swimming, Water polo (men's final)	Indoor pool	17,000	
2004 Athens	Athens Olympic Aquatic Centre	Diving, Synchronized swimming, Water polo	Outdoor pool	23,000 (total of three pools)	
2008 Beijing	Beijing National Aquatic Center	Diving, Synchronized swimming	Indoor pool	17,000	
2012 London	London Aquatics Centre	Diving, Modern pentathlon (swimming), Synchronized swimming	Indoor pool	17,500	
2016 Rio de Janeiro	Olympic Aquatics Stadium	Synchronized swimming, Water polo	Indoor pool	18,000	
2020 Tokyo	Tokyo Aquatics Centre	Diving, Synchronized swimming	Indoor pool	15,000	
2024 Paris	Plenitude Arena	Water polo (finals)	Indoor pool	15,220	
2028 Los Angeles	SoFi Stadium	Ceremonies (opening/closing)	Indoor pool	38,000	
2032 Brisbane	Brisbane Live	Water polo (finals)	Indoor pool	17,000	

== Gallery of venues ==
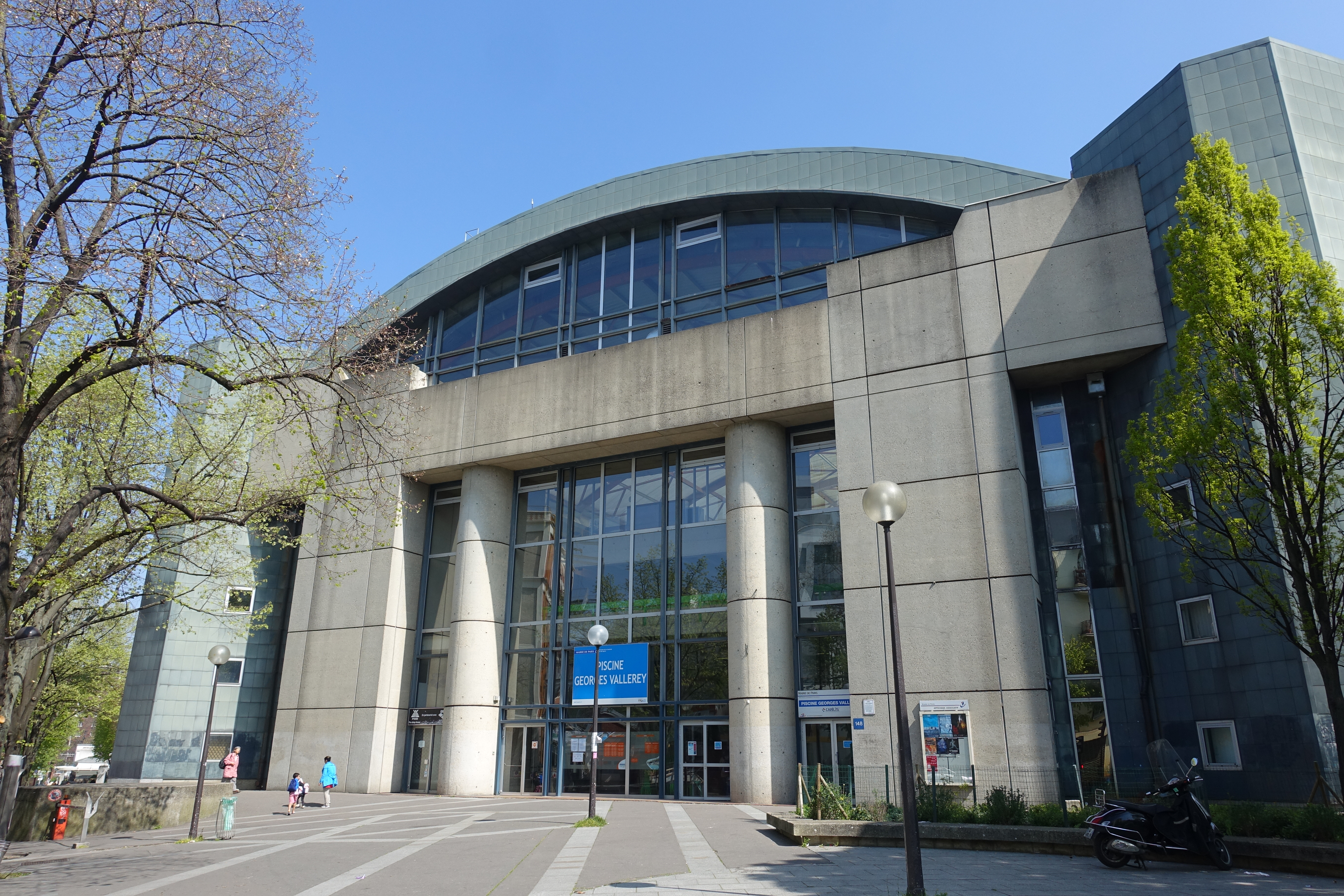
The Piscine des Tourelles hosted swimming at the 1924 Summer Olympics in Paris.

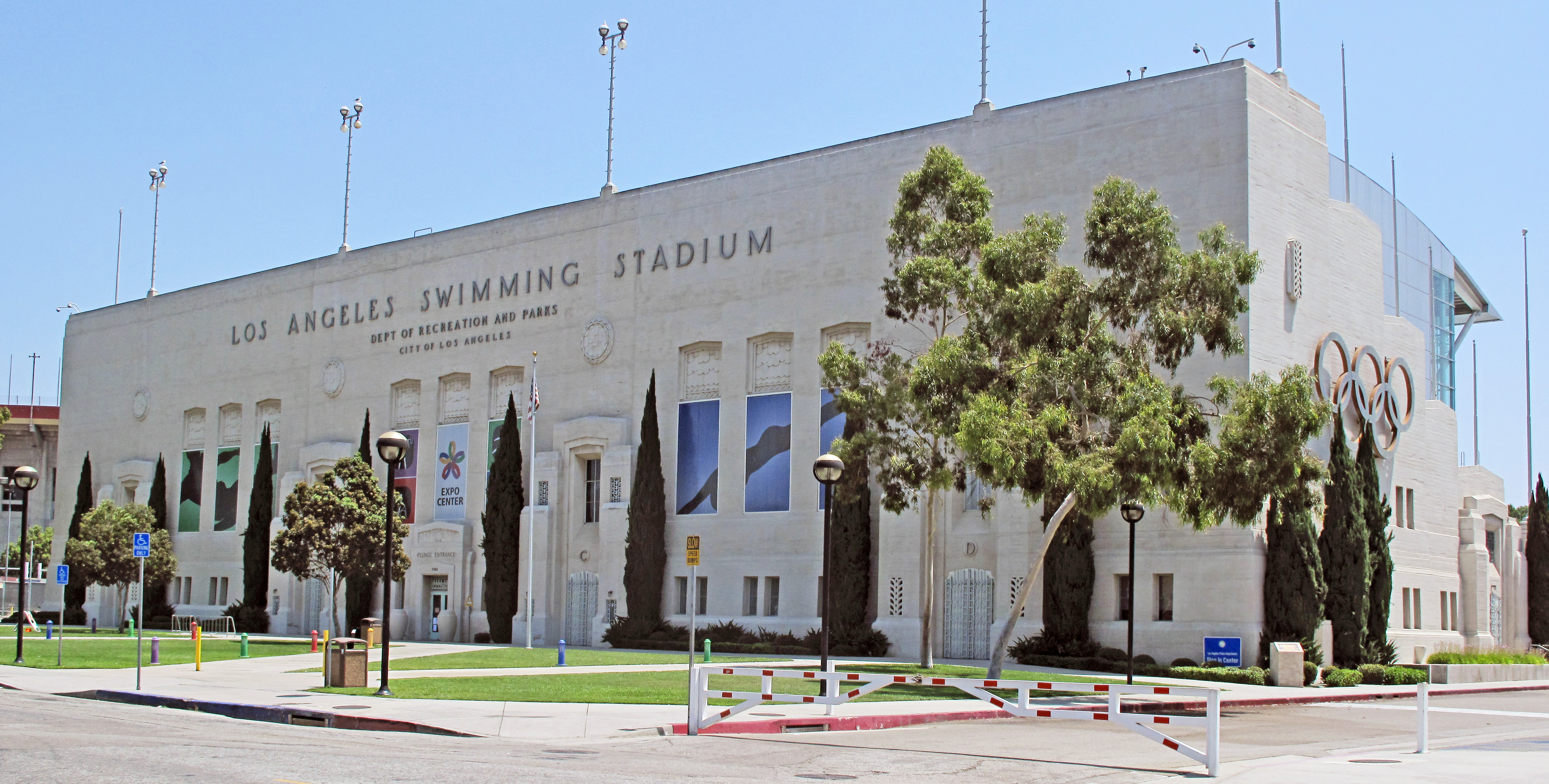
The LA84 Foundation/John C. Argue Swim Stadium hosted swimming at the 1932 Summer Olympics in Los Angeles.

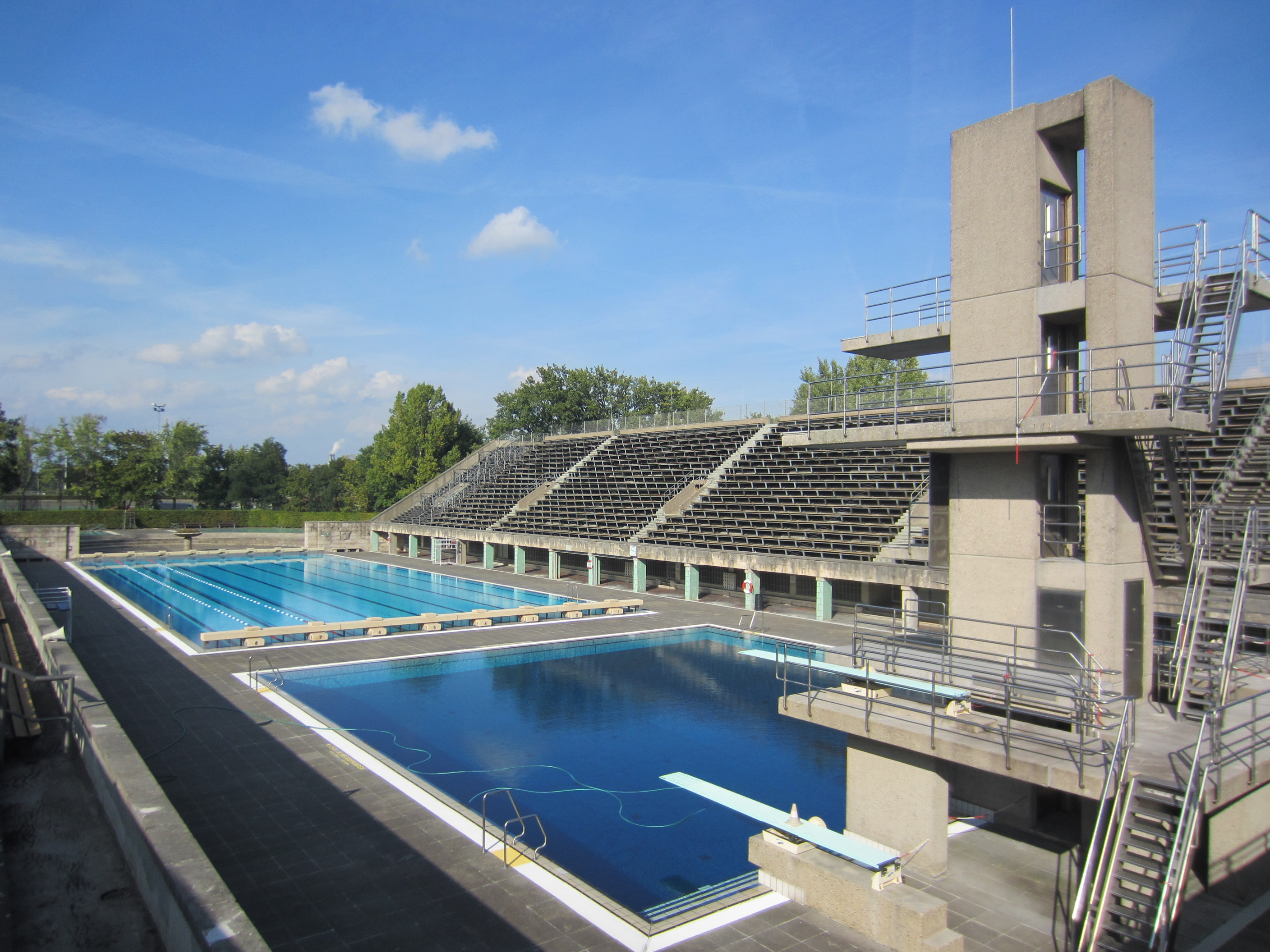
Olympic Swimming Stadium hosted swimming at the 1936 Summer Olympics in Berlin.

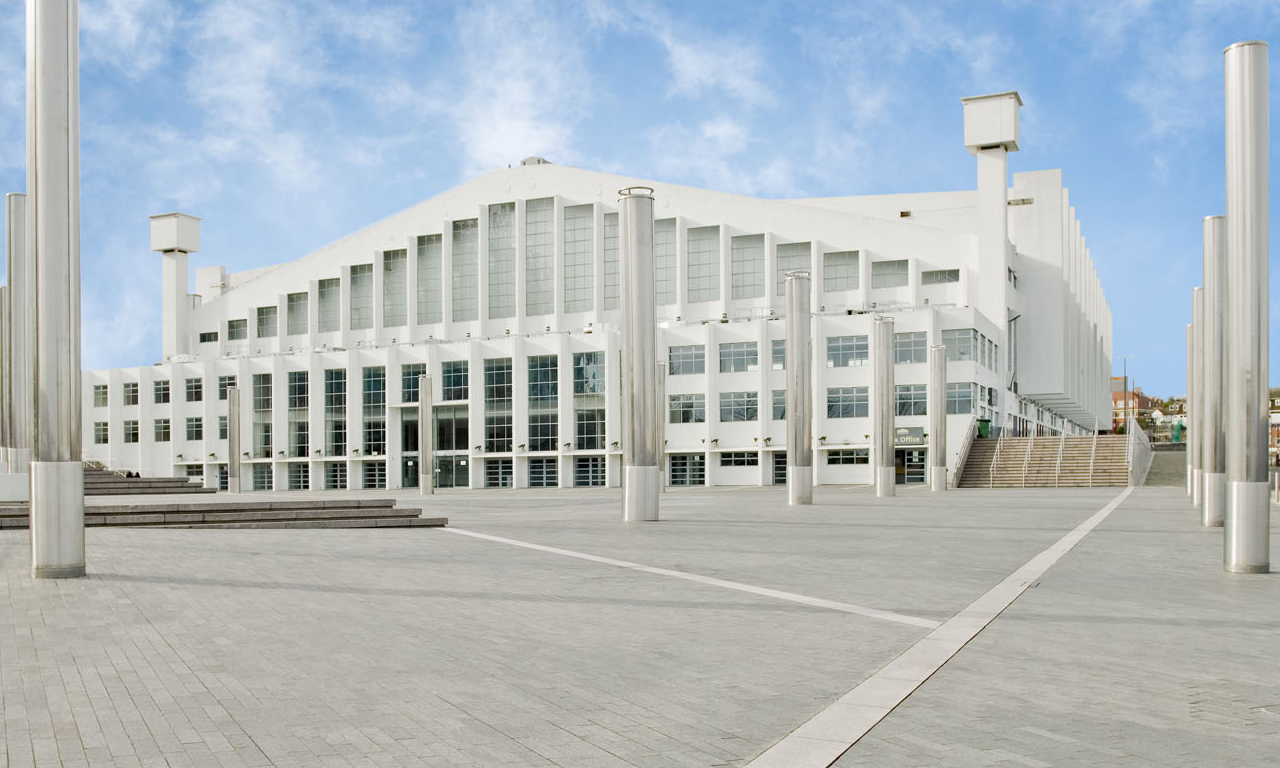
The Empire Pool (now Wembley Arena) hosted swimming at the 1948 Summer Olympics in London.

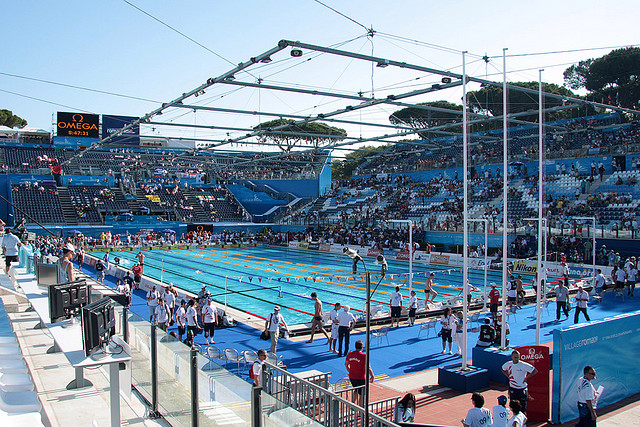
The Stadio Olimpico del Nuoto hosted swimming at the 1960 Summer Olympics in Rome.

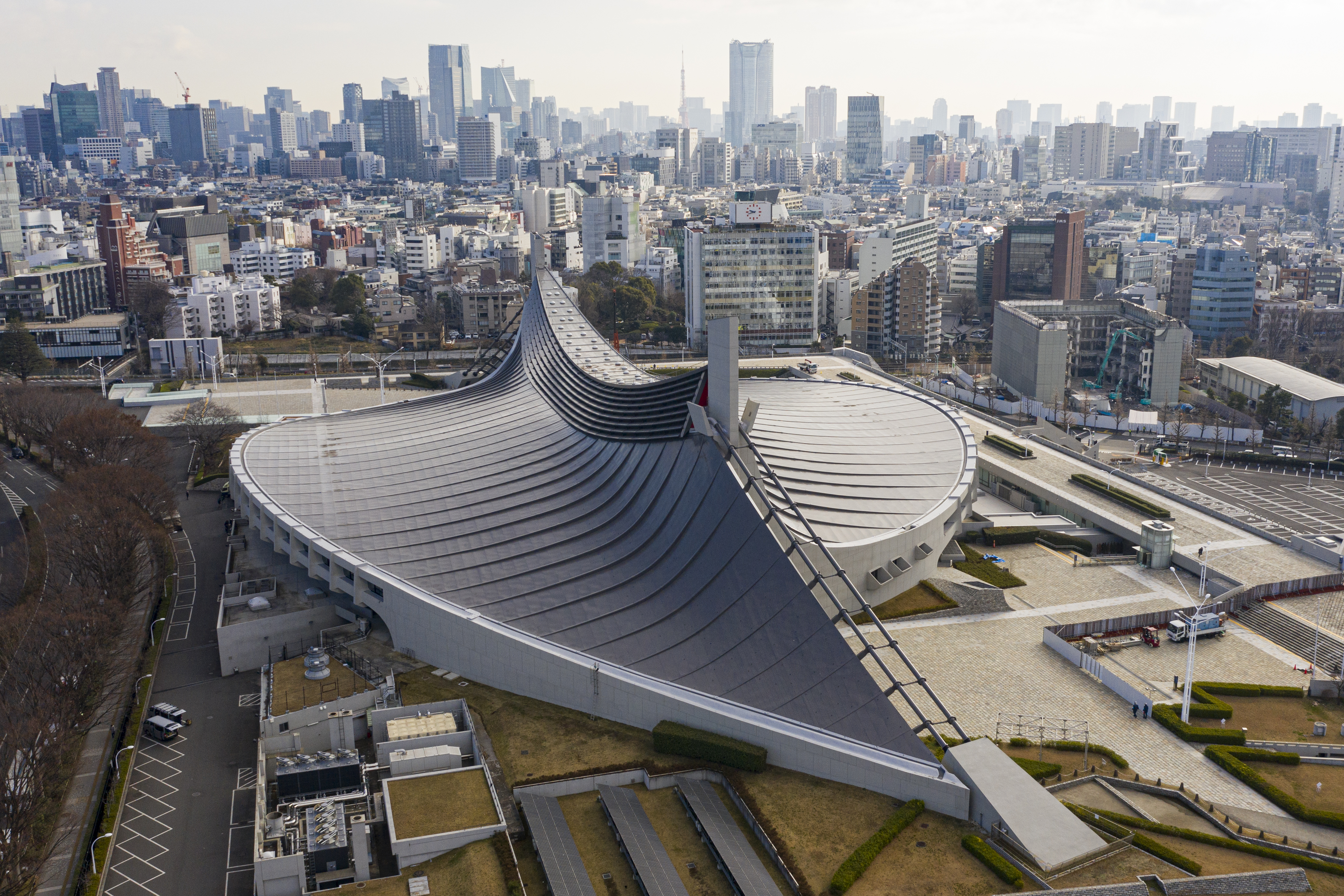
Yoyogi National Stadium hosted swimming at the 1964 Summer Olympics in Tokyo.

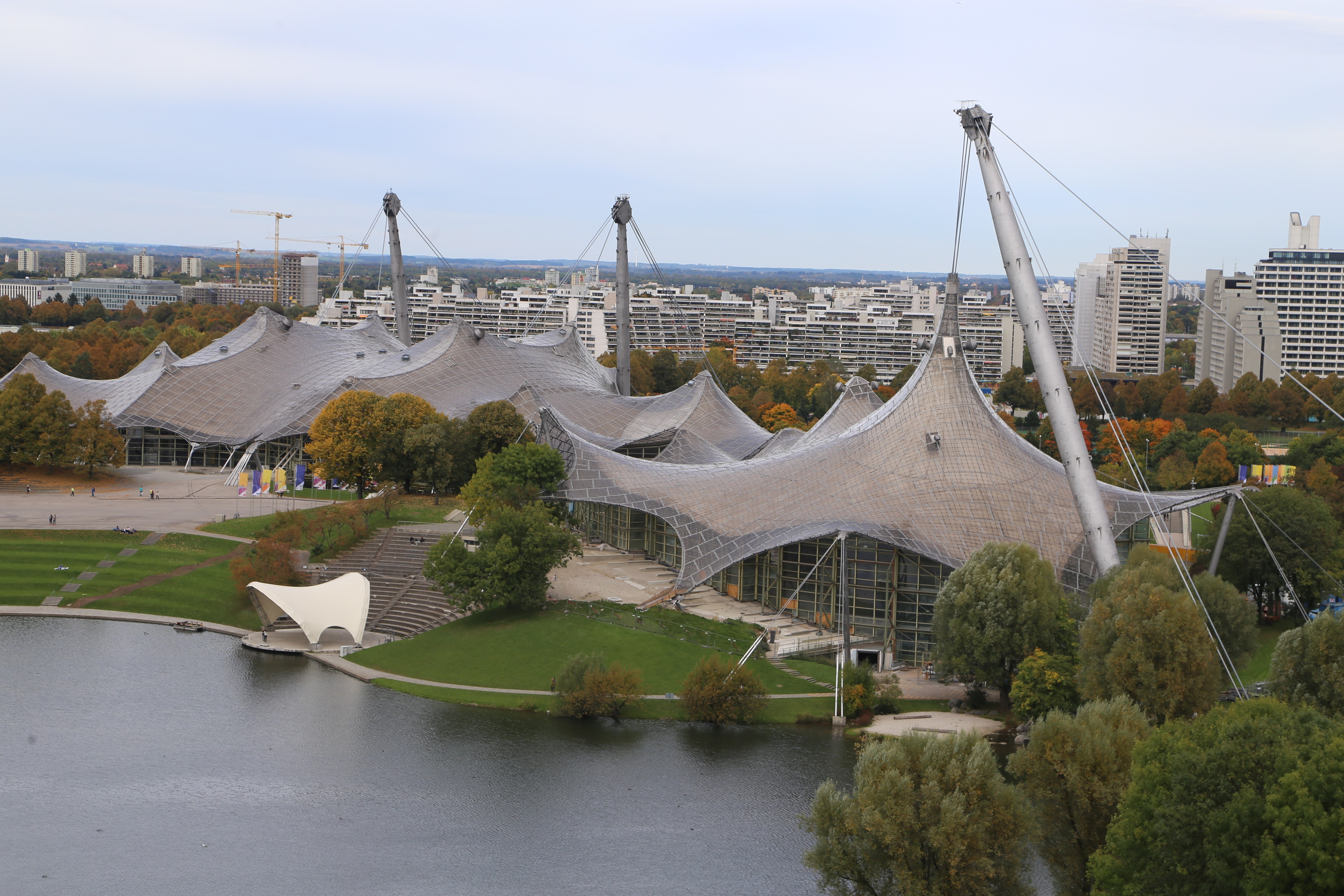
The Olympia Schwimmhalle hosted swimming at the 1972 Summer Olympics in Munich.

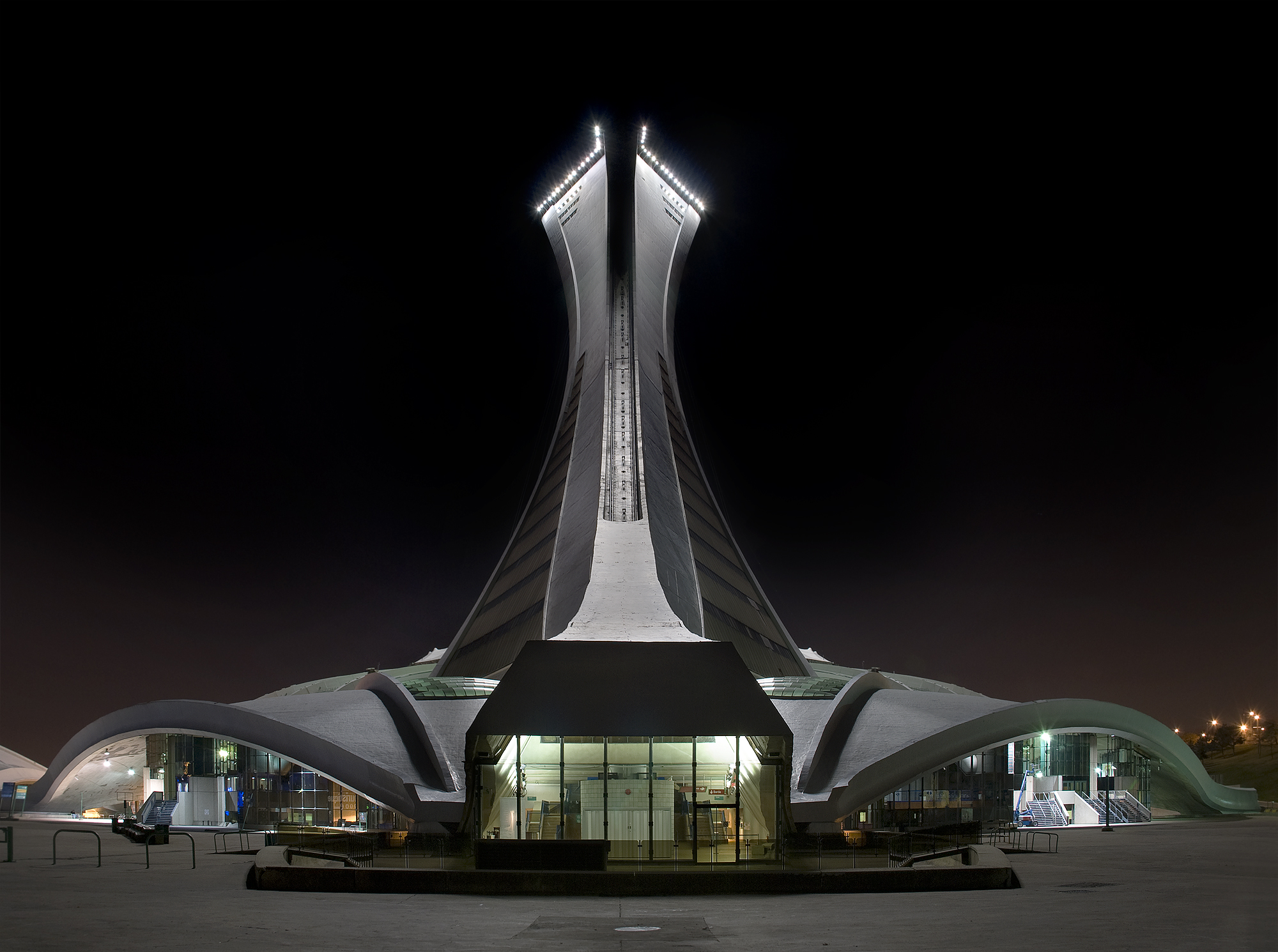
The Montreal Olympic Pool hosted swimming at the 1976 Summer Olympics.

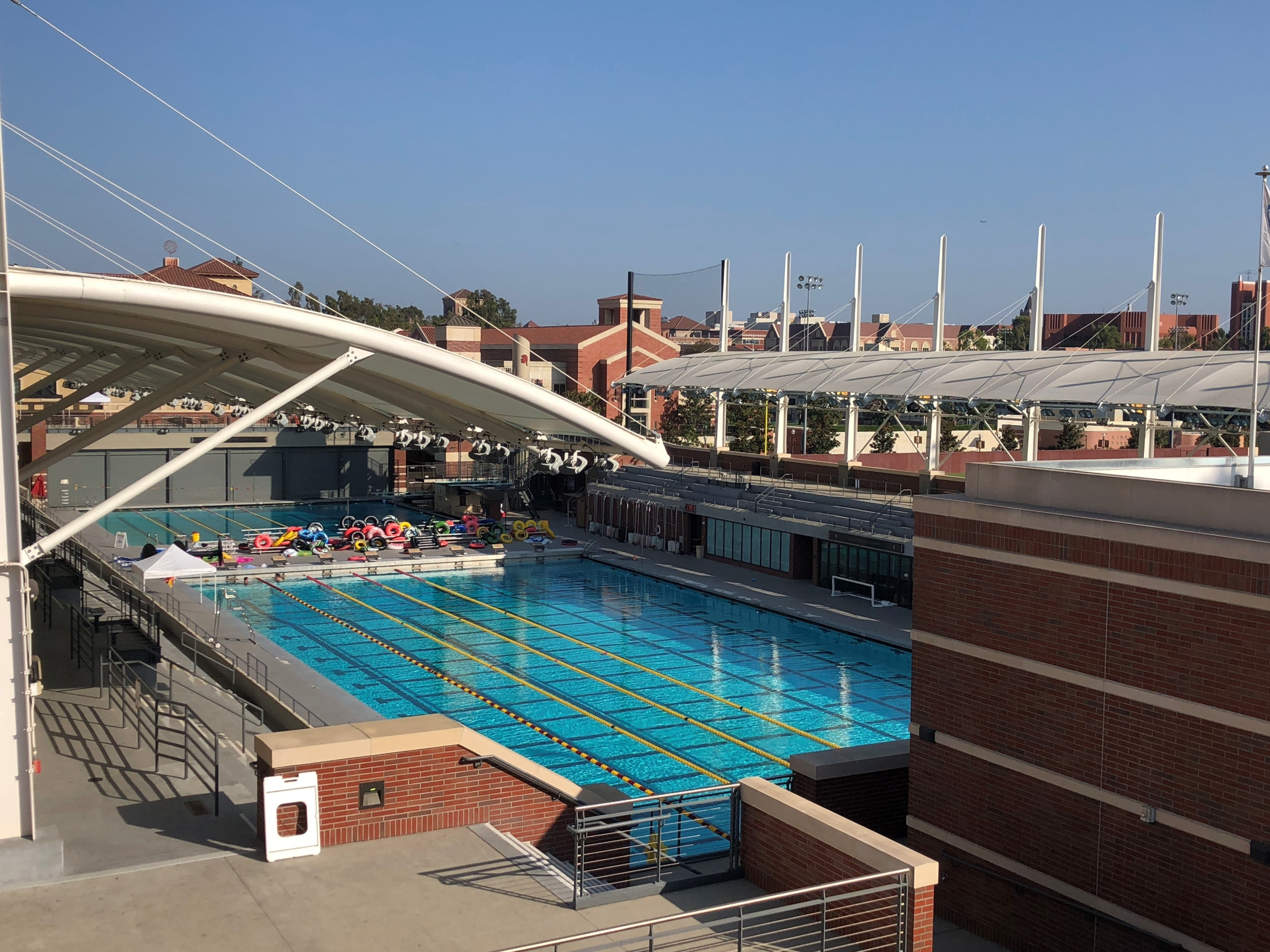
The Uytengsu Aquatics Center hosted swimming at the 1984 Summer Olympics in Los Angeles.

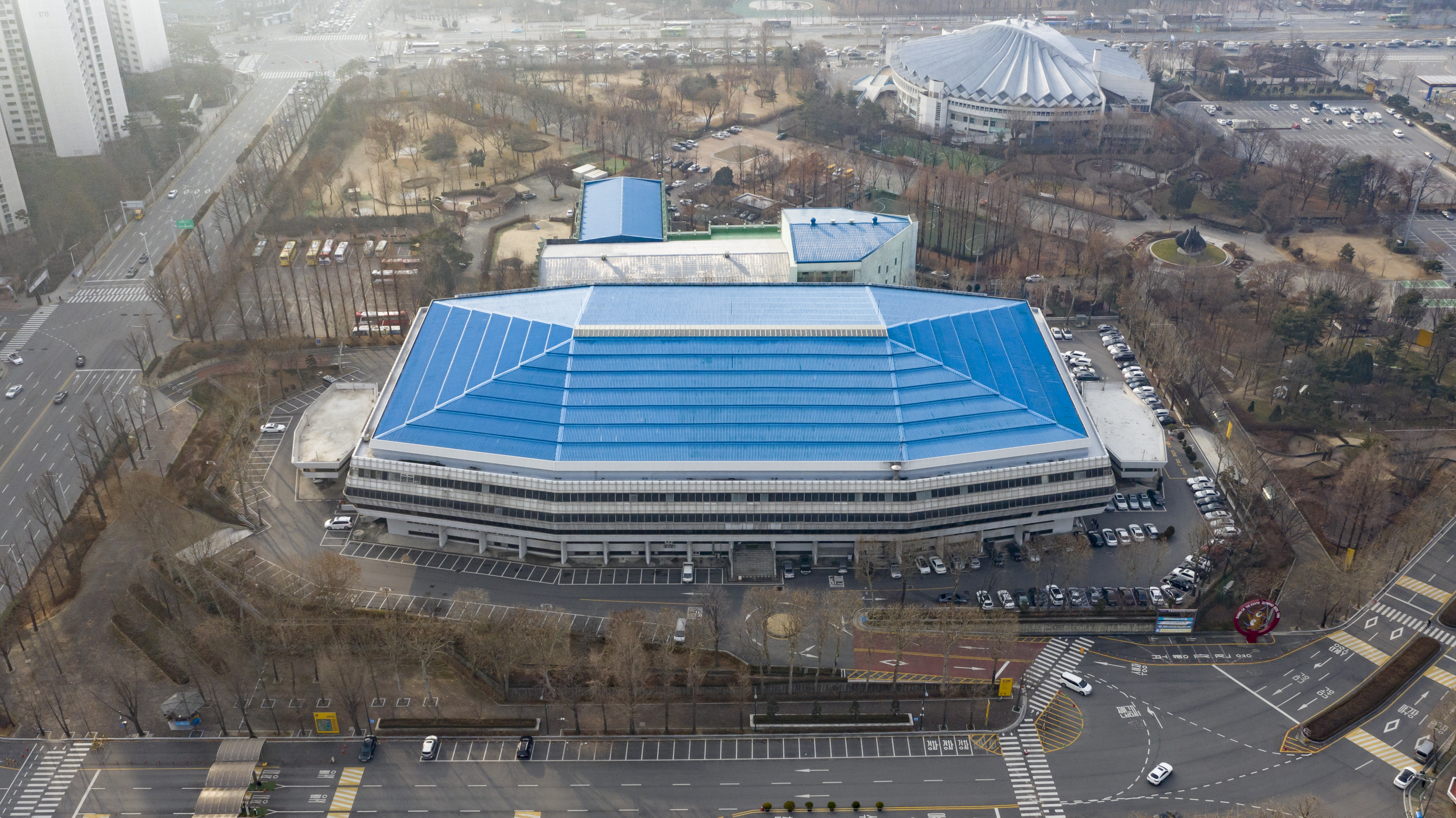
The Jamsil Indoor Swimming Pool hosted swimming at the 1988 Summer Olympics in Seoul.

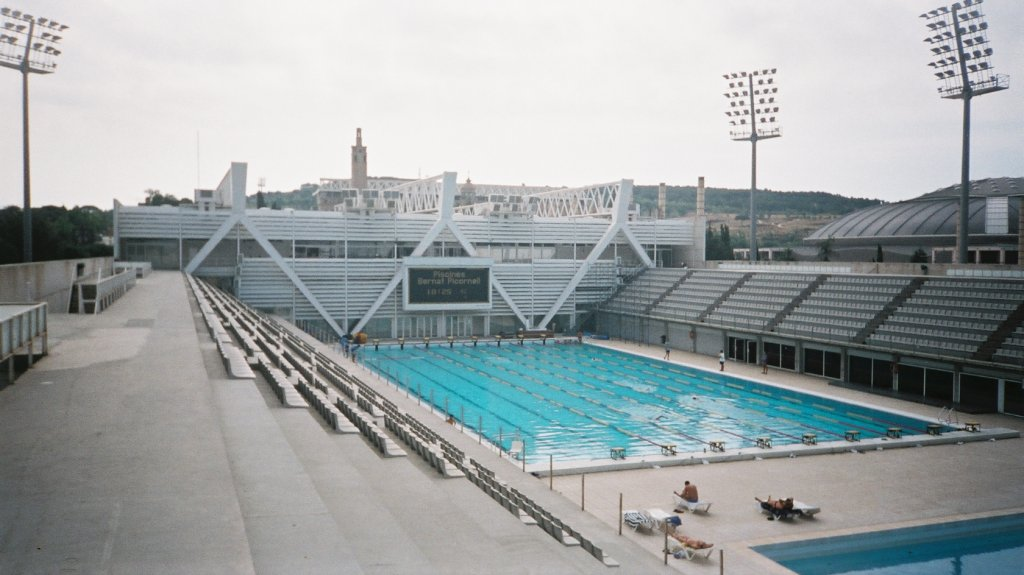
Piscines Bernat Picornell hosted swimming at the 1992 Summer Olympics in Barcelona.

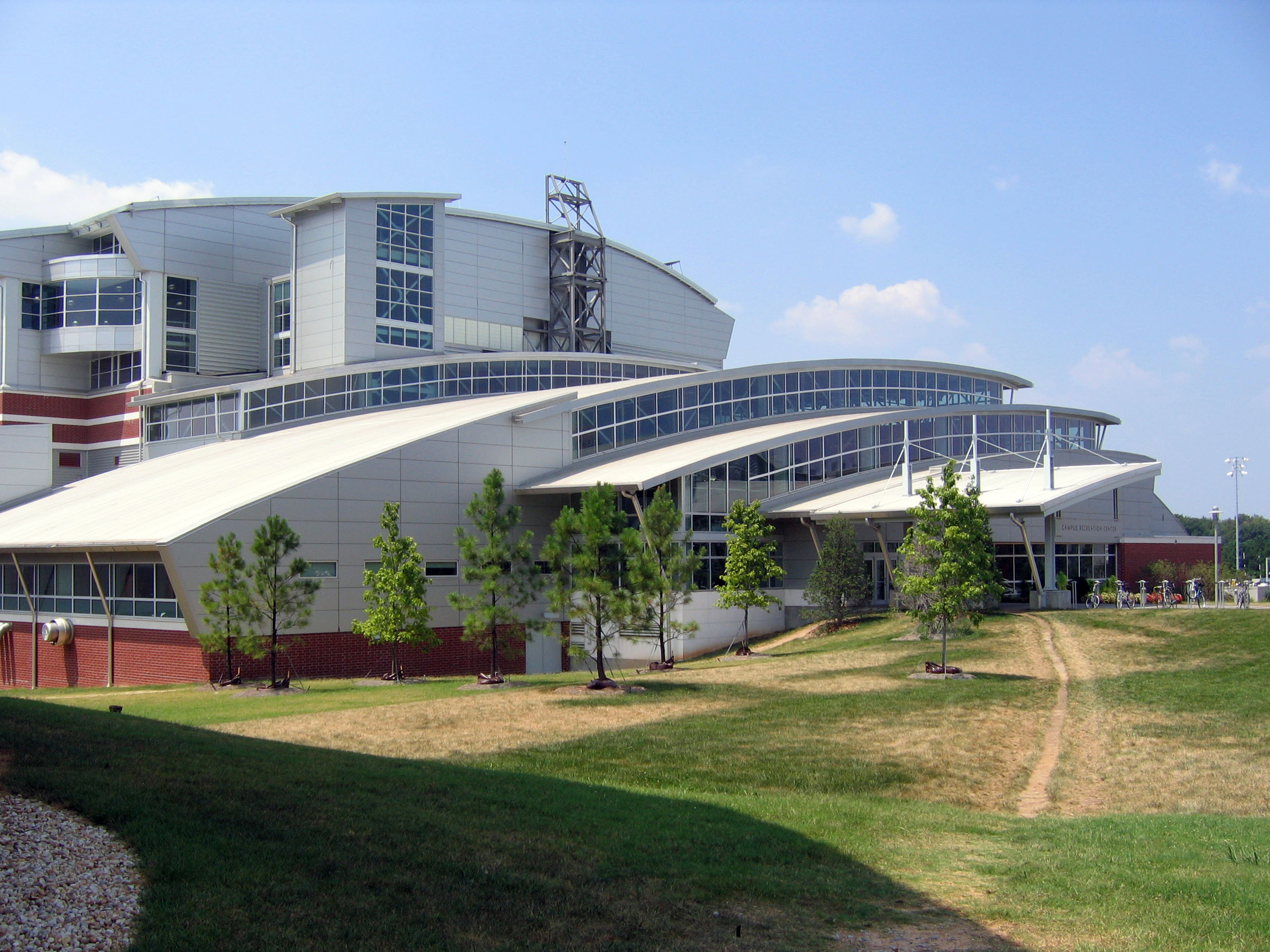
Georgia Tech Campus Recreation Center hosted swimming at the 1996 Summer Olympics in Atlanta.

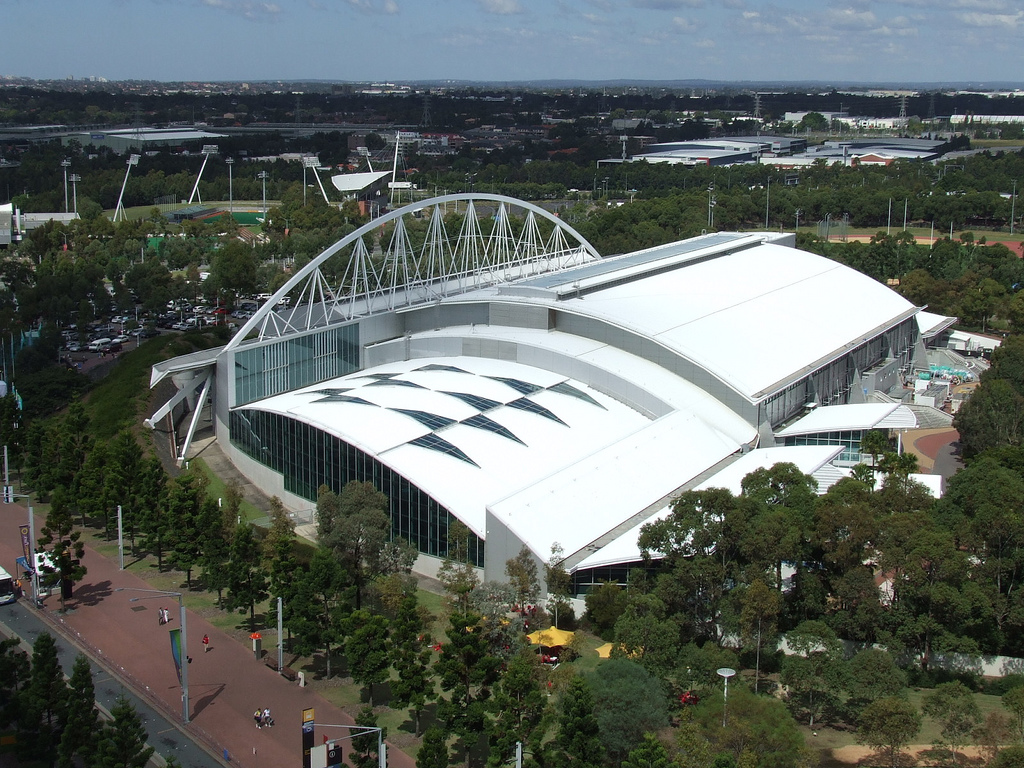
The Sydney Olympic Park Aquatics Centre hosted swimming at the 2000 Summer Olympics.

Athens Olympic Aquatics Centre hosted swimming during the 2004 Summer Olympics.

The National Aquatics Centre hosted swimming at the 2008 Summer Olympics in Beijing.

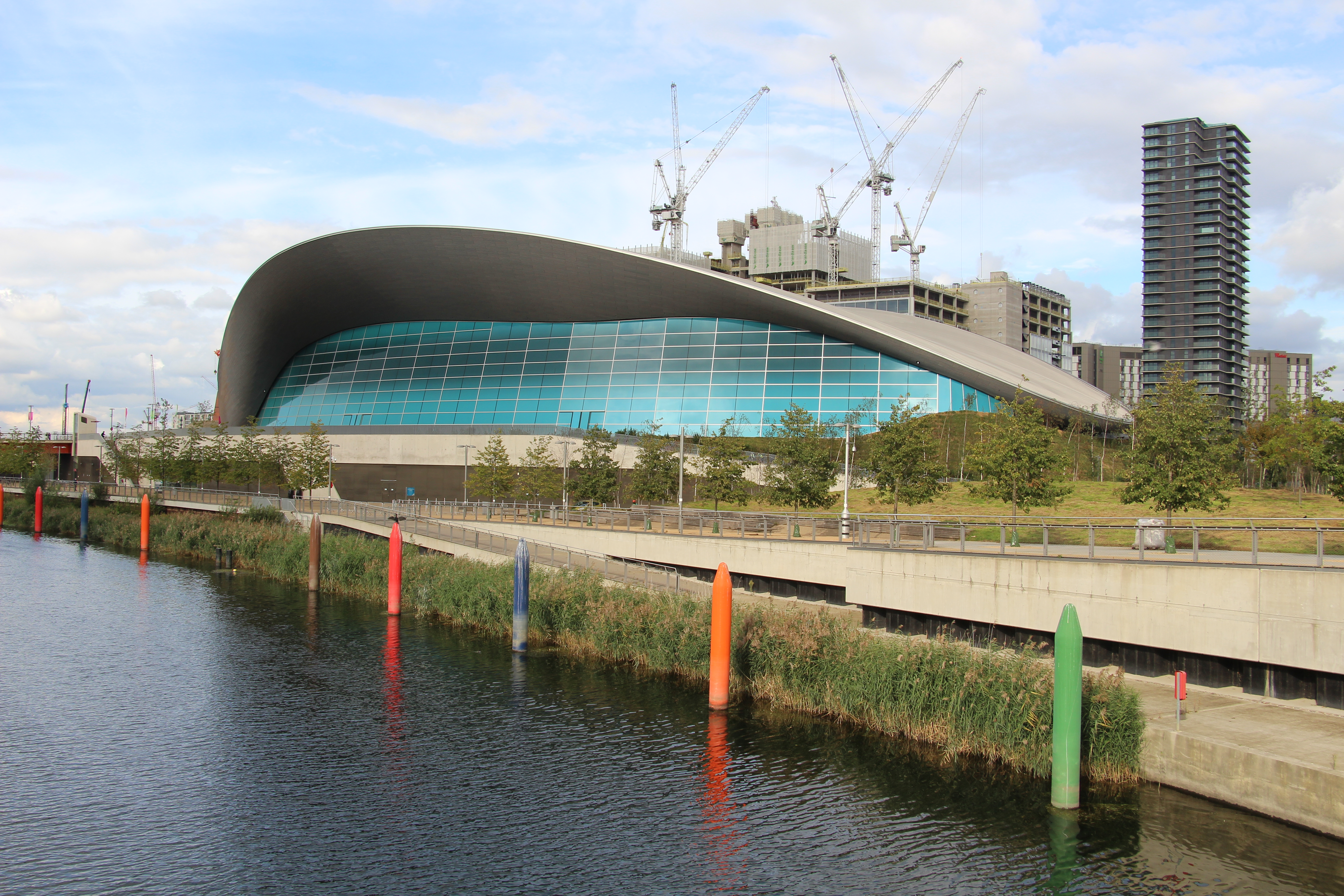
The London Aquatics Centre hosted swimming at the 2012 Summer Olympics.

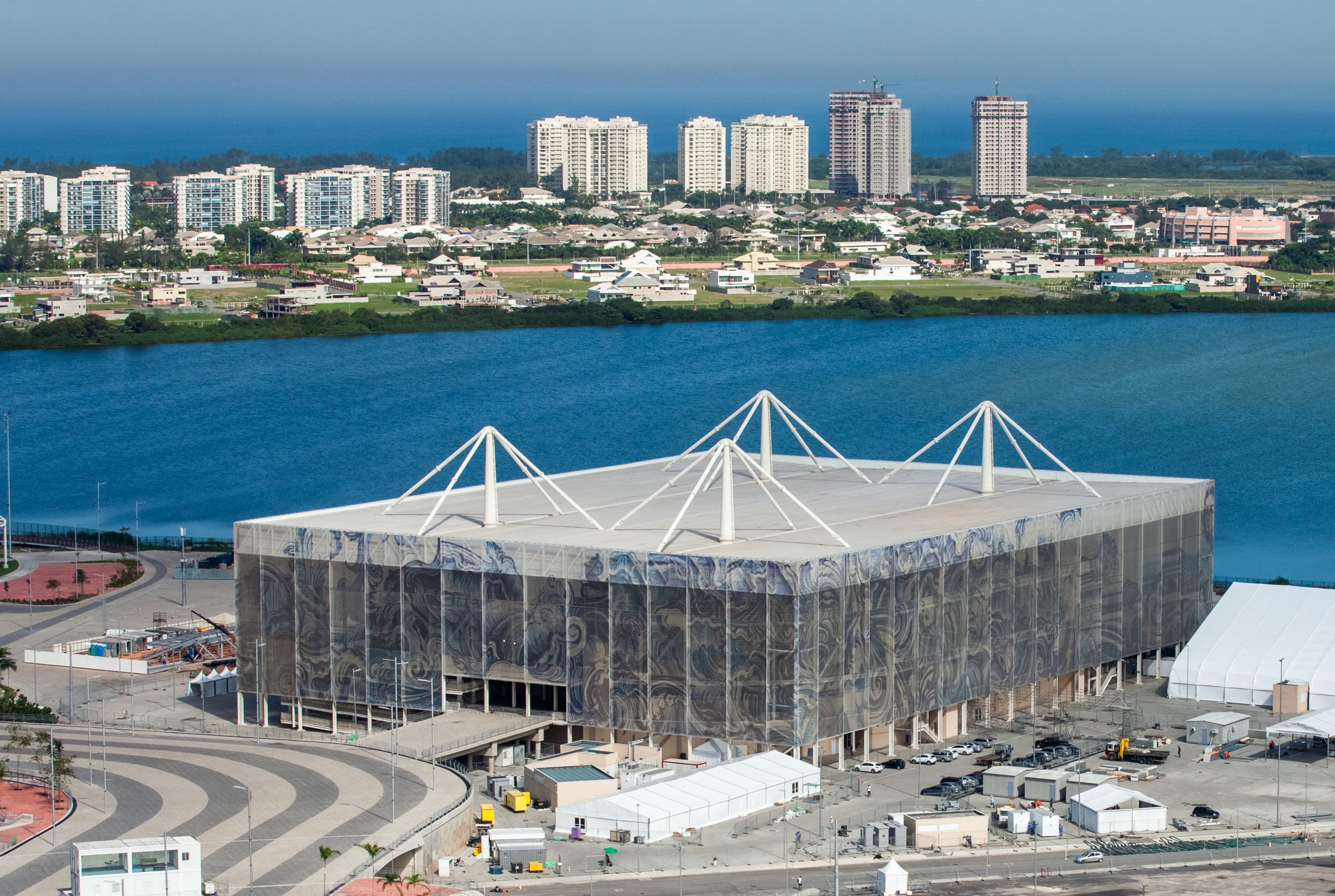
The Olympic Aquatics Stadium hosted swimming at the 2016 Summer Olympics in Rio de Janeiro.

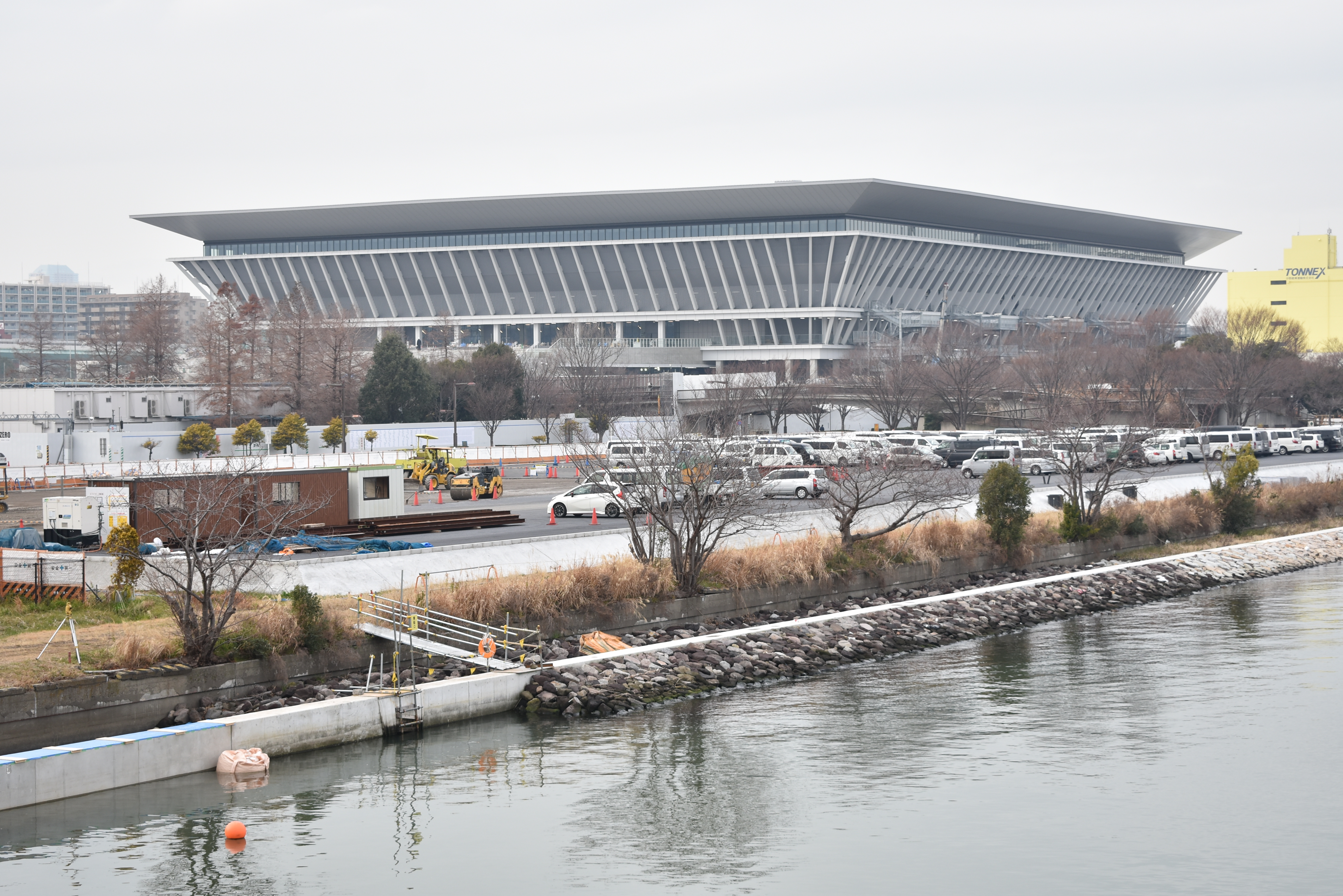
The Tokyo Aquatics Centre hosted swimming at the 2020 Summer Olympics.

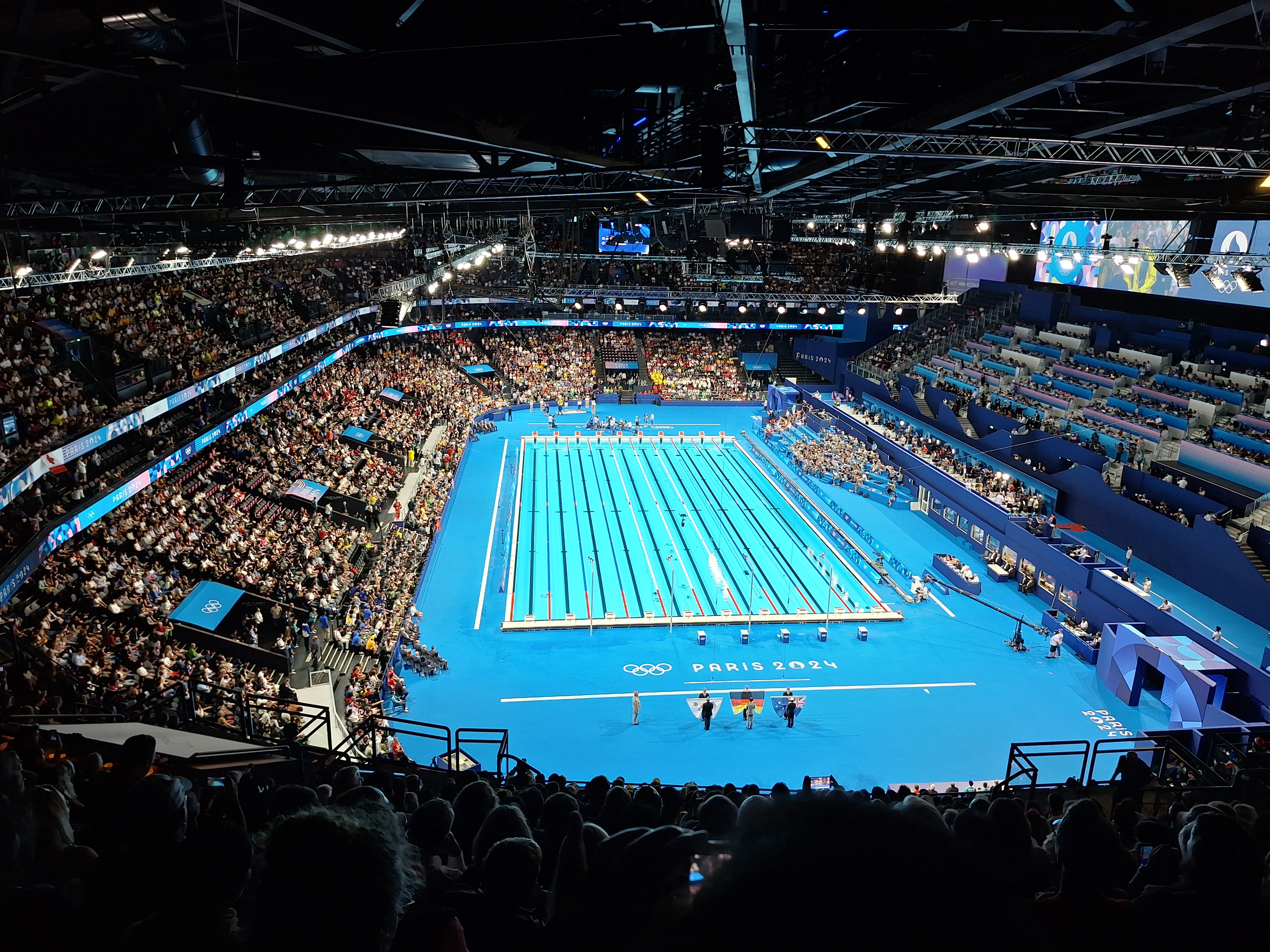
Plenitude Arena hosted swimming at the 2024 Summer Olympics in Paris.

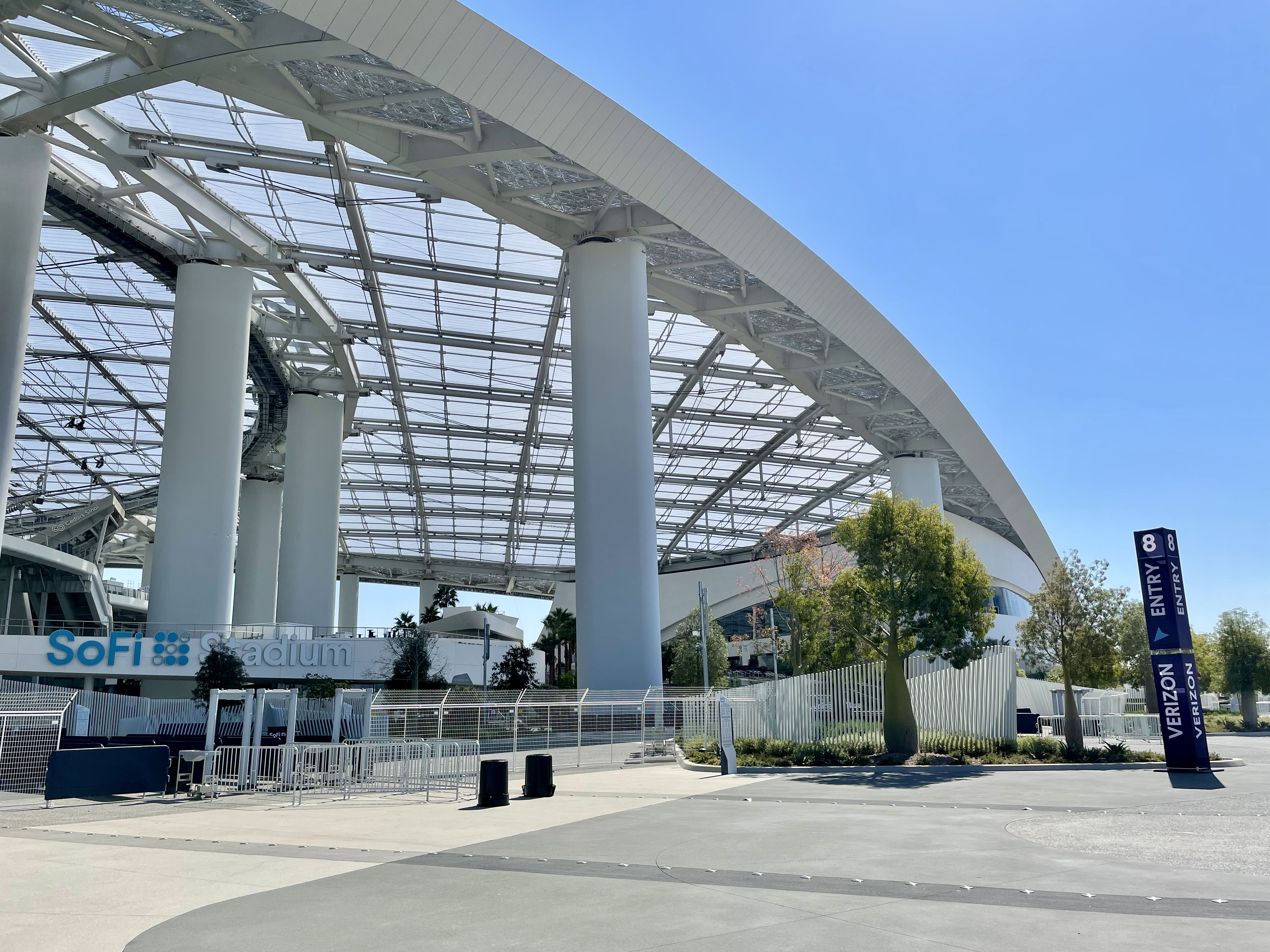
SoFi Stadium will host swimming at the 2028 Summer Olympics in Los Angeles.
