= Half-inch tape =

Half-inch tape is magnetic tape with a width of 1/2 in (12.7 mm) in a format such as:

- Computer magnetic tape data storage

- Reel-to-reel

- UNISERVO
- IBM 7 track
- IBM 9 track

- Cartridge

- IBM 3480
- IBM 3590
- IBM 3592
- Digital Linear Tape (DLT)
- Linear Tape-Open (LTO)

- Videotape

- Reel-to-reel

- CV-2000
- EIAJ-1

- Video cassette

- Betacam
- Betamax
- VHS
- S-VHS
