= Tape drive =

Data storage device

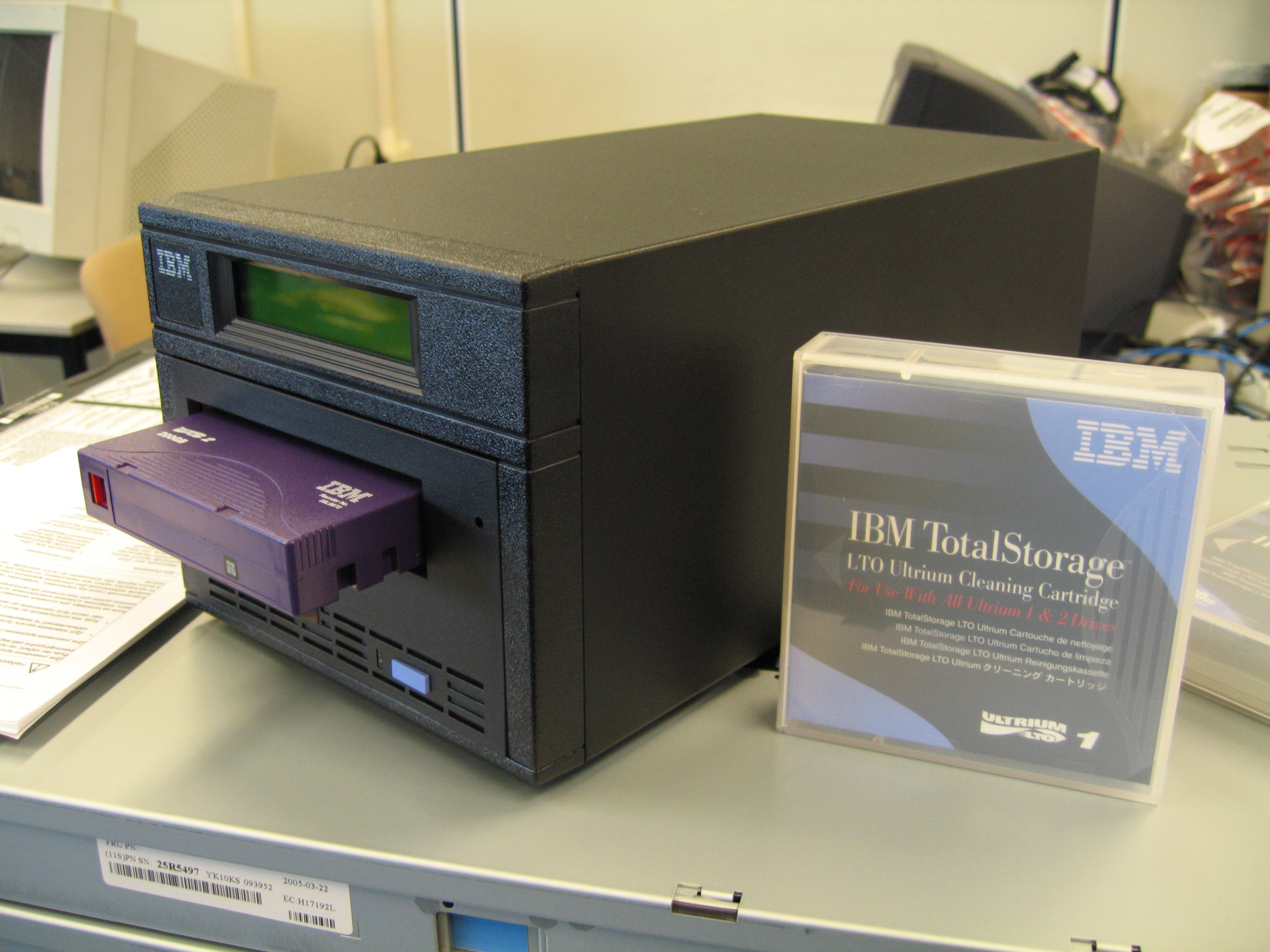
Linear Tape-Open (LTO) drive and cartridge.

A tape drive is a data storage device that reads and writes data on a magnetic tape. Magnetic-tape data storage is typically used for offline, archival data storage. Tape media generally has a favorable unit cost and long archival stability.

A tape drive provides sequential access storage, unlike a hard disk drive, which provides direct access storage. A disk drive can move to any position on the disk in a few milliseconds, but a tape drive must physically wind tape between reels to read any one particular piece of data. As a result, tape drives have very large average access times. However, tape drives can stream data very quickly off a tape when the required position has been reached. For example, as of 2017 Linear Tape-Open (LTO) supports continuous data transfer rates of up to 360 MB/s, a rate comparable to hard disk drives.

== Design ==
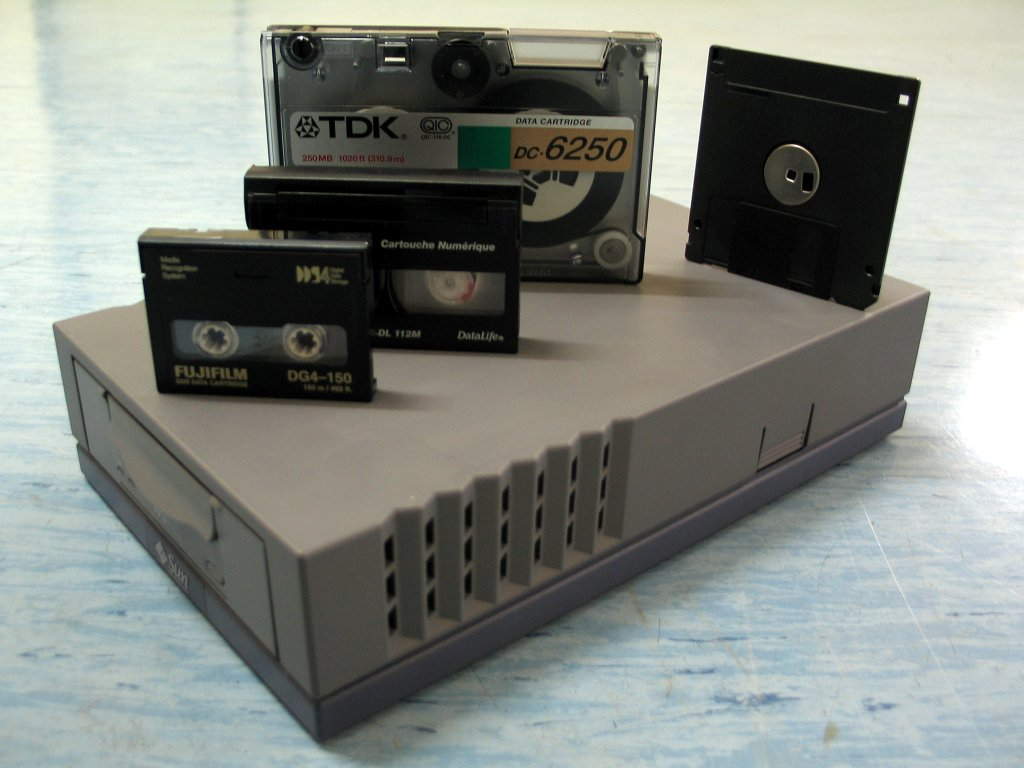
DDS tape drive (bottom). Above, from left to right: DDS-4 tape (20 GB), 112m Data8 tape (2.5 GB), QIC DC-6250 tape (250 MB), and a 3.5" floppy disk (1.44 MB).

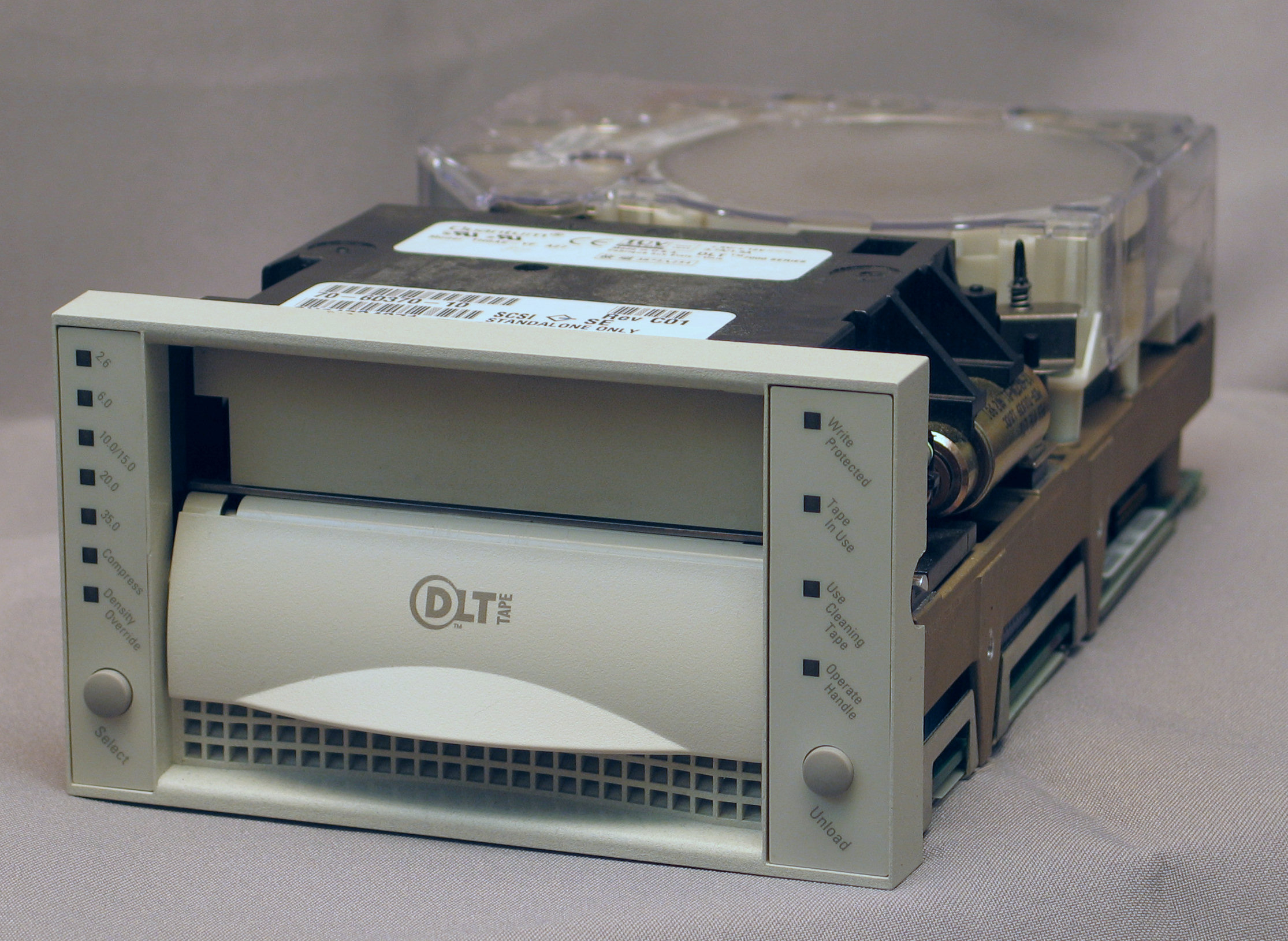
An internal 5.25-inch full-height DLT tape drive.

Magnetic-tape drives with capacities of less than one megabyte were first used for data storage on mainframe computers in the 1950s. As of 2018, capacities of 20 terabytes or higher of uncompressed data per cartridge were available.

In early computer systems, magnetic tape served as the main storage medium because although the drives were expensive, the tapes were inexpensive. Some computer systems ran the operating system on tape drives such as DECtape. DECtape had fixed-size indexed blocks that could be rewritten without disturbing other blocks, so DECtape could be used like a slow disk drive.

Data tape drives may use advanced data integrity techniques such as multilevel forward error correction, shingling, and linear serpentine layout for writing data to tape.

Tape drives can be connected to a computer with SCSI, Fibre Channel, SATA, USB, FireWire, FICON, or other interfaces. (Note: Historical interfaces include also ESCON, parallel port, IDE, Pertec.) Tape drives are used with autoloaders and tape libraries which automatically load, unload, and store multiple tapes, increasing the volume of data that can be stored without manual intervention.

In the early days of home computing, floppy and hard disk drives were very expensive. Many computers had an interface to store data via an audio tape recorder, typically on Compact Cassettes. Simple dedicated tape drives, such as the professional DECtape and the home ZX Microdrive and Rotronics Wafadrive, were also designed for inexpensive data storage. However, the drop in disk drive prices made such alternatives obsolete.

=== Data compression ===
As some data can be compressed to a smaller size than the original files, it has become commonplace when marketing tape drives to state the capacity with the assumption of a 2:1 compression ratio; thus a tape with a capacity of 80 GB would be sold as "80/160". The true storage capacity is also known as the native capacity or the raw capacity. The compression ratio actually achievable depends on the data being compressed. Some data has little redundancy; large video files, for example, already use compression and cannot be compressed further. A database with repetitive entries, on the other hand, may allow compression ratios better than 10:1.

=== Technical limitations ===
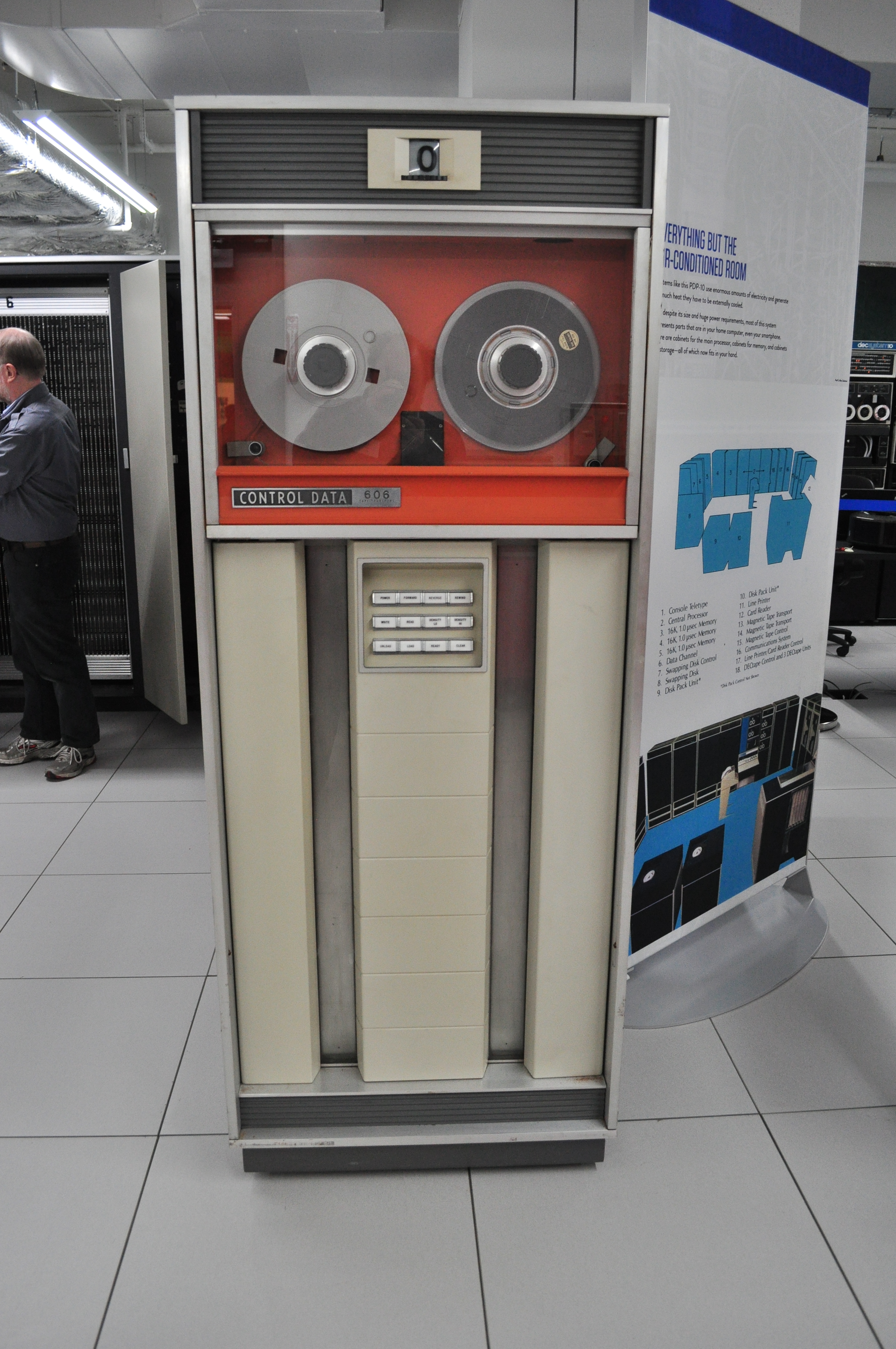
Control Data Corporation 606 tape drive, showing two long vertical vacuum columns in the lower part.

A disadvantageous effect termed shoe-shining occurs during read/write if the data transfer rate falls below the minimum threshold at which the tape drive heads were designed to transfer data to or from a continuously running tape. In this situation, the modern fast-running tape drive is unable to stop the tape instantly. Instead, the drive must decelerate and stop the tape, rewind it a short distance, restart it, position back to the point at which streaming stopped and then resume the operation. If the condition repeats, the resulting back-and-forth tape motion resembles that of shining shoes with a cloth. Shoe-shining decreases the attainable data transfer rate, drive and tape life, and tape capacity.

In early tape drives, non-continuous data transfer was normal and unavoidable. Computer processing power and available memory were usually insufficient to provide a constant stream, so tape drives were typically designed for start-stop operation. Early drives used very large spools, which necessarily had high inertia and did not start and stop moving easily. To provide high start, stop and seek performance, several feet of loose tape was played out and pulled by a suction fan down into two deep open channels on either side of the tape head and capstans. The long thin loops of tape hanging in these vacuum columns had far less inertia than the two reels and could be rapidly started, stopped and repositioned. The large reels would move as required to keep the slack tape in the vacuum columns.

Later, most tape drives of the 1980s introduced the use of an internal data buffer to somewhat reduce start-stop situations. (Note: Some modern designs are still developed to operate in a non-linear fashion. IBM's 3xxx formats are designed to keep the tape moving irrespective of the data buffer—segments are written when data is available, but gaps are written when buffers run empty. When the drive detects an idle period, it re-reads the fragmented segments into a buffer and writes them back over the fragmented sections—a 'virtual backhitch'.) These drives are often referred to as tape streamers. The tape was stopped only when the buffer contained no data to be written, or when it was full of data during reading. As faster tape drives became available, despite being buffered, the drives started to suffer from the shoe-shining sequence of stop, rewind, start.

Some newer drives have several speeds and implement algorithms that dynamically match the tape speed level to the computer's data rate. Example speed levels could be 50 percent, 75 percent and 100 percent of full speed. A computer that streams data slower than the lowest speed level (e.g., at 49 percent) will still cause shoe-shining.

== Media ==
Magnetic tape is commonly housed in a casing such as a cassette or cartridge—for example, the 4-track cartridge and the Compact Cassette. The cassette contains magnetic tape to provide different audio content using the same player. The outer shell, made of plastic, sometimes with metal plates and parts, permits ease of handling of the fragile tape, making it far more convenient and robust than having spools of exposed tape. Simple analog cassette audio tape recorders were commonly used for data storage and distribution on home computers at a time when floppy disk drives were very expensive. The Commodore Datasette was a dedicated data version using the same media.

== History ==
| Year | Manufacturer | Model | Capacity | Advancements |
|---|---|---|---|---|
| 1951 | Remington Rand | UNISERVO | 224 KB | First computer tape drive, used 1/2" nickel-plated phosphor bronze tape |
| 1952 | IBM | 726 | | Use of plastic tape (cellulose acetate); 7-track tape that could store every 6-bit byte plus a parity bit |
| 1953 | IBM | 727 | | |
| 1958 | IBM | 729 (Note: As of January 2009, the Computer History Museum in Mountain View, California has working IBM 729 tape drives attached to its working IBM 1401 system.) | | Separate read/write heads providing transparent read-after-write verification. |
| 1961 | IBM | 7340 | | 10-track 1" tape cartridge that could store every 8-bit byte plus a parity bit. (Note: Derived from the IBM 7955 "TRACTOR" on the IBM 7950 Harvest.) |
| 1964 | IBM | 24xx | | 9-track tape that could store every 8-bit byte plus a parity bit |
| 1970s | IBM | 34xx | | Auto-loading tape reels and drives, avoiding manual tape threading 6250 BPI with Group coded recording (GCR) for error recovery |
| 1972 | 3M | Quarter Inch Cartridge (QIC-11) | 20 MB | Tape cassette (with two reels); Linear serpentine recording |
| 1974 | IBM | 3850 | | Tape cartridge (with single reel); First tape library with robotic access |
| 1975 | (various) | Kansas City standard | | Use of standard audio cassettes |
| 1977 | Commodore International | Commodore Datasette | 1978 KB | |
| 1980 | Cipher | (F880?) | | RAM buffer to mask start-stop delays |
| 1984 | IBM | 3480 | 200 MB | Internal takeup reel with automatic tape takeup mechanism. Thin-film magnetoresistive (MR) head |
| 1984 | DEC | TK50 | 94 MB | Digital Linear Tape (DLT) line of products |
| 1986 | IBM | 3480 | 400 MB | Hardware data compression (IDRC algorithm) |
| 1987 | Exabyte/Sony | EXB-8200 | 2.4 GB | First helical digital tape drive Elimination of the capstan and pinch-roller system |
| 1993 | DEC | Tx87 | | Tape directory (database with first tapemark nr on each serpentine pass) |
| 1995 | IBM | 3570 | | Factory-recorded servo tracks for precise head positioning (Time Based Servoing or TBS); Tape on unload rewound to the midpoint—halving access time (requires two-reel cassette) |
| 1996 | HP | DDS3 | 12 GB | Partial-response maximum-likelihood (PRML) reading method—no fixed thresholds |
| 1997 | IBM | VTS | | Virtual tape—disk cache that emulates tape drive |
| 1999 | Exabyte | Mammoth-2 | 60 GB | Small cloth-covered wheel for cleaning tape heads. Inactive burnishing heads to prep the tape and deflect any debris or excess lubricant. Section of cleaning material at the beginning of each data tape. |
| 2000 | Quantum | Super DLT | 110 GB | Optical servo precisely positioning the heads |
| 2000 | Linear Tape-Open | LTO-1 | 100 GB | |
| 2003 | IBM | 3592 | 300 GB | Virtual backhitch |
| 2003 | Linear Tape-Open | LTO-2 | 200 GB | |
| 2003 | Sony | SAIT-1 | 500 GB | Single-reel cartridge for helical recording |
| 2005 | IBM | TS1120 | 700 GB | |
| 2005 | Linear Tape-Open | LTO-3 | 400 GB | |
| 2006 | StorageTek | T10000 | 500 GB | Multiple head assemblies and servos per drive |
| 2007 | Linear Tape-Open | LTO-4 | 800 GB | |
| 2008 | IBM | TS1130 | 1 TB | Encryption capability integrated into the drive |
| 2008 | StorageTek | T10000B | 1 TB | |
| 2010 | Linear Tape-Open | LTO-5 | 1.5 TB | Linear Tape File System (LTFS), which allows accessing files on tape in the file system directly (similar to disk filesystems) without an additional tape library database |
| 2011 | IBM | TS1140 | 4 TB | Linear Tape File System (LTFS) supported |
| 2011 | StorageTek | T10000C | 5 TB | Linear Tape File System (LTFS) supported |
| 2012 | Linear Tape-Open | LTO-6 | 2.5 TB | |
| 2013 | StorageTek | T10000D | 8.5 TB | |
| 2014 | IBM | TS1150 | 10 TB | |
| 2015 | Linear Tape-Open | LTO-7 | 6 TB | |
| 2017 | IBM | TS1155 | 15 TB | |
| 2017 | Linear Tape-Open | LTO-8 | 12 TB | |
| 2018 | IBM | TS1160 | 20 TB | |
| 2021 | Linear Tape-Open | LTO-9 | 18 TB | |
| 2023 | IBM | TS1170 | 50 TB | |
| 2025 | Linear Tape-Open / IBM | LTO-10 | 30 TB | |

== Capacity ==
Manufacturers often specify the capacity of tapes using data compression techniques; compressibility varies for different data (commonly 2:1 to 8:1), and the specified capacity may not be attained for some types of real data. As of 2014, tape drives capable of higher capacity were still being developed.

In 2011, Fujifilm and IBM announced that they had been able to record 29.5 billion bits per square inch with magnetic-tape media developed using Barium Ferrite (BaFe) particles and nanotechnologies, allowing drives with true (uncompressed) tape capacity of 35 TB. The technology was not expected to be commercially available for at least a decade.

In 2014, Sony and IBM announced that they had been able to record 148 billion bits per square inch with magnetic tape media developed using a new vacuum thin-film forming technology able to form extremely fine crystal particles, allowing true tape capacity of 185 TB.

On December 15, 2020, Fujifilm and IBM announced a Strontium Ferrite (SrFe) technology able, in theory, to store 580 TB per tape cartridge.
