= IBM Magstar MP 3570 =

Series of tape drives and data storage media formats by IBM

The IBM 3570 is a series of tape drives and corresponding magnetic tape data storage media formats developed by IBM. The storage technology and media were introduced using the name Magstar MP, combining the IBM storage brand name Magstar with MP for MultiPurpose. The IBM product number 3570 was associated with the tape drives and libraries that used the Magstar MP media.

The IBM 3570 technology was specifically produced for mid-range computer systems, and for the tape cartridges to be primarily stored in and handled by automated tape libraries. The technology was specifically designed for fastest access to the data, with quick robotic tape loading and near-instant head to tape contact in mid-tape after loading. However, slower tape technologies with higher per-tape capacities proved more successful in the marketplace, and the IBM 3570 technology did not enjoy a large market penetration.

== Technology ==
The IBM Magstar MP technology is a compact tape technology using a small dual-reel tape cartridge which was introduced in September, 1996. The key design points of this technology are:

- Fast access to data through quick tape load/unload cycle times, and a mid-tape load-point design
- High reliability of media and cartridges under heavy duty read and write loads
- Heavy use of automated libraries for tape handling
- High performance in a mid-range computing environment

The technology was upgraded in 1998 to increase both capacity and performance.

This tape format is based on an 8mm tape with 128 tracks arranged in an interleaved longitudinal serpentine format. The tapes used a metal particle technology, and the tape drives used a magneto-resistive head technology, with LZ1 data compression built into the drive. An unusual feature is the mid-tape load-point.

In contrast, most tape technologies view a tape as a linear length, similar to an audio cassette. Normally, a tape load is completed by spooling past the head to an initial load-point at one end of the tape, while forward tape motion brings the head closer towards the end-of-tape/end-of-track in a linear fashion.

IBM chose a different approach, placing the start-of-tape initial load-in point halfway along the tape's length. Relative to the centre load-point, tracks run both backwards and forwards towards each end of the tape.

This improves average access times, with a worst-case seek request needing spool through only a maximum of half the tape's length. In comparison, traditional formats may need to spool through the full tape length, doubling the time-to-seek of IBM's product. This family of drives, alongside the StorageTek 9840, may be the only modern tape storage products taking this mid-tape load-point approach.

== Media ==
The original tapes, called B-type, had a capacity of 5 GB uncompressed. The follow-on C-type tapes had the same capacity, but were faster. The final tape media, called C-XL, had a capacity of 7GB uncompressed. IBM advertising suggested an expected typical 3:1 data compression ratio.

== Drives and Libraries ==
The IBM 3570 product line included three types of tape systems:

- Individual tape drives, such as the IBM 3570-B00
- Table-top or rack-mounted tape auto-loaders with one or two drives, that could function as small libraries, such as the IBM 3570-B12
- Stand-alone tape libraries capable of holding multiple tape drives and many dozens of tape cartridges, such as the IBM 3575.

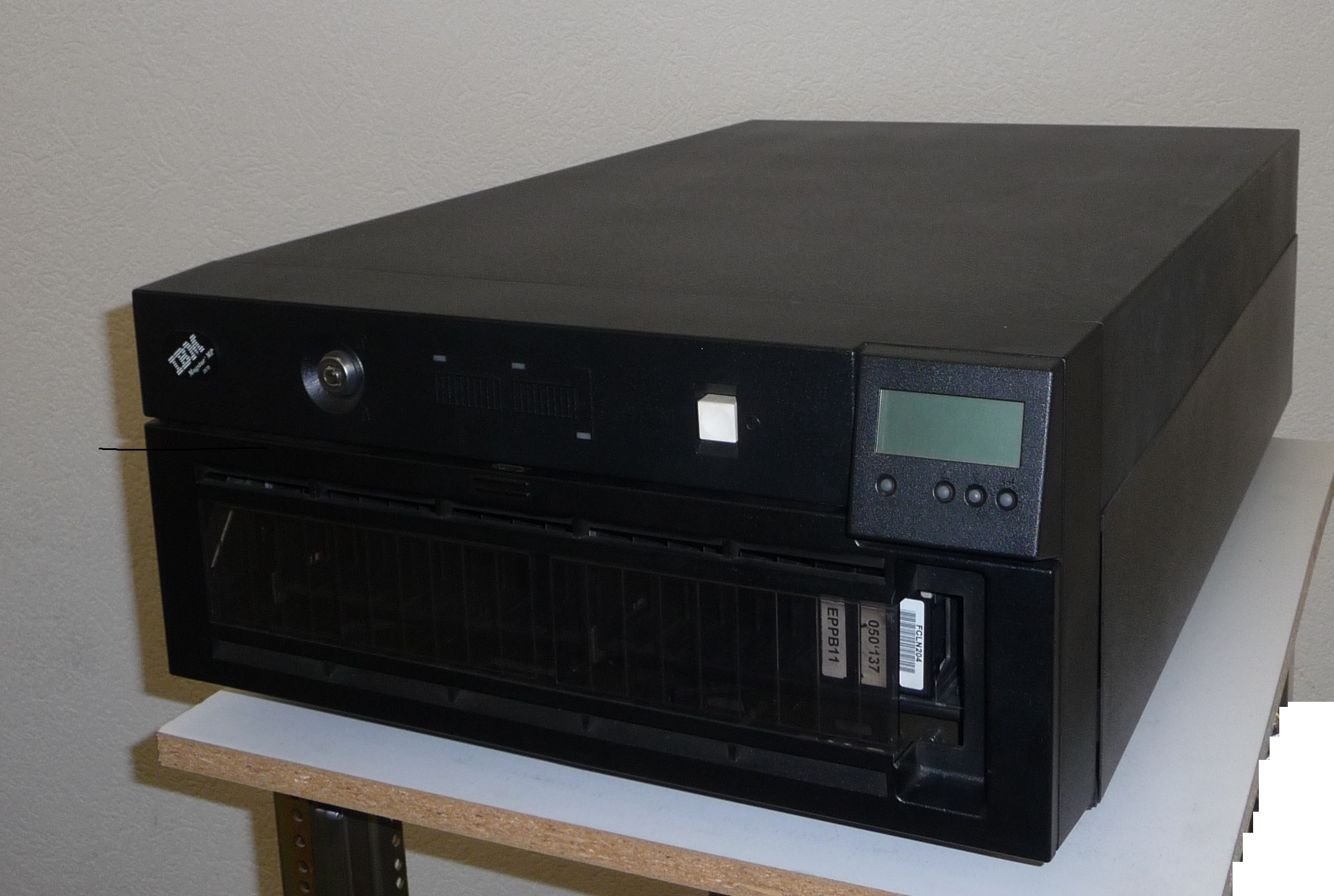
IBM 3570-B01 (from 1997)

The original drives, called B-type, had a native uncompressed data rate of 5 MB/second. Data compression performed "on the fly" in the drive could provide higher data rates, depending on the compressibility of the data being written. The follow-on drives, called C-type, had a native uncompressed data rate of 7 MB/second.

The full-size IBM 3575 libraries were capable of being partitioned into multiple logical libraries and shared by multiple computer "hosts." Cartridges were organized in columns within the IBM 3575 library, with one curious aspect that the tape cartridges were inverted from one column to the next. This could cause frustration when operators hand-loaded cartridges into libraries.

== Interfaces ==
Device drivers were available for the most popular mid-range computer platforms of the day, including MS Windows, Unix, and the IBM AS/400, as well as for the most popular backup management software packages of the time.

== See also ==
- Computer data storage
- Data proliferation
- Information repository
- Magnetic storage
