= Computer tape =

Computer tape may refer to:

- Punched tape or perforated paper tape
- Magnetic tape in one of several formats:
  - Tape drive
