= 3480 (disambiguation) =

3480 may refer to:

- A.D. 3480, a year in the 4th millennium CE
- 3480 BC, a year in the 4th millennium BCE
- 3480, a number in the 3000 (number) range

== Other uses ==
- 3480 Abante, an asteroid in the Asteroid Belt, the 3480th asteroid registered
- Texas Farm to Market Road 3480, a state highway
- 3480, the Strong's Concordance code for the word "Nazarene"
- 3480, an IBM storage tape format
