= 3590 =

3590 may refer to:

- 3590, the ninetieth year of the 36th century
- IBM 3590, a series of tape drives and corresponding magnetic tape data storage media formats developed by IBM
- Patient Protection and Affordable Care Act (H.R. 3590), a United States federal statute signed into law on March 23, 2010
