= 3490 =

3490 may refer to:

- A.D. 3490, a year in the 4th millennium CE
- 3490 BC, a year in the 4th millennium BCE
- 3490, a number in the 3000 (number) range

== Other uses ==
- 3490 storage tape format, from the IBM 3480 Family
- 3490 Šolc, an asteroid in the Asteroid Belt, the 3490th asteroid registered
- Texas Farm to Market Road 3490, a state highway
