= Physics arXiv Blog =

The Physics arXiv Blog
- Website type: Blogs
- Available in: English
- Owner: Medium (service)
- Creator: Kentucky FC
- Launched: 2007

The Physics arXiv Blog aims to offer an alternative view of new ideas in science. It is based on, although independent of, the arXiv pre-print repository run by the Cornell University. Started in 2007, in 2009 it was hosted by the MIT Technology Review. In 2013, it was moved to the platform Medium. In 2015, it moved back to the MIT Technology Review.

The Physics arXiv Blog has been said to offer "the best physics coverage around" by the Wired journal in May 2008. It was included among the "Five great physics blogs" by The Guardian.

== Publication model ==
Content appears to be crowd sourced from within the physics community. Similar to The Economist, articles seem to lack specific author bylines.
