= Qualstar =

American electronics manufacturer

Qualstar Corporation
- Type: Public
- Traded as: OTC Pink: QBAK
- Founded: 1984; 42 years ago
- Headquarters: Camarillo, California
- Products: Magnetic tape data storage

Qualstar Corporation is a former American manufacturer of magnetic tape data storage products, based in Camarillio, California. It was founded in 1984 as a 9-track tape drive manufacturer and now makes tape library products. The company sold its last 9-track tape drive in 2006 and as of March 2006 has sold all remaining parts inventory to Vinastar, an aftermarket vendor.

== Company History ==
Qualstar announced the TLS-4000 Series tape library family in 1994 and began shipment in 1995. Initially using Exabyte 8mm tape drives, the TLS-4000 Series was the first library product line to automate Sony's popular AIT drives. Leveraging the basic TLS design, Qualstar subsequently introduced the TLS-6000 Series for DLT and SDLT drives, the TLS-5000 Series for Sony SAIT drives and the TLS-8000 Series for LTO drives. The TLS-2000 Series for 4mm drives was also produced for a limited time. By 2011, only select models of the TLS-8000 family remain in production.

In 2001, the company introduced the first RLS-Series of rack mountable tape libraries. A number of models supporting AIT, SAIT, SDLT and LTO tape drive technologies were produced. The RLS-8000 Series for LTO technology continues in production. Various models house up to 44 tape cartridges and four LTO SAS or Fibre Channel tape drives in a 5U high package. In 2010 Qualstar introduced the RLS-8500 Series that house up to 114 tapes and five LTO drives in a 10U high mechanism.

In 2006, Qualstar made its entry into the enterprise tape library market by launching the XLS-Series Enterprise Library System. Using patented technology, the XLS-Series introduced interchangeable Library Resource Modules (LRMs)and storage modules (MEMs) in highly flexible configurations that could be combined to exceed 7,000 tapes and 128 LTO tape drives. The XLS family has continued to expand, adding four more LRM models and a second MEM module. XLS models currently span capacities from 160 slots to over 11,000 slots and can house over 150 drives.

In 2025, Qualstar repackages a series of modular tape libraries called the Q-series family. There are flexible options for tape drive connectivity, module stacking, and LTO generations. The Q series currently can reach up to 640 slots, and a maximum capacity of 6.0 PB of compressed data. The Q-series is software agnostic, and readily connects to most archive providers. The Company is also re-entering the enterprise market with a full rack 1000+ solution that can be presented as "tape as object" using the S3 protocol if needed

In 2025 Qualstar announced support for customers affected by the exit of the market of Overland Storage
