= NAB Show =

American annual trade show

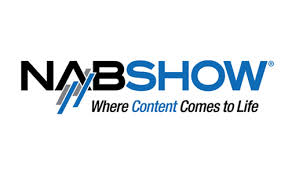
- Status: Active
- Venue: Las Vegas Convention Center
- Location: Paradise, Nevada
- Country: United States
- Inaugurated: 1923; 103 years ago
- Attendance: 100,000
- Organizer: National Association of Broadcasters
- Website: www.nabshow.com

NAB Show is an annual trade show produced by the National Association of Broadcasters. It takes place in April, and has been held since 1991 at the Las Vegas Convention Center in Las Vegas, Nevada. The show's tagline is "Where Content Comes to Life". NAB show is the largest show for media, entertainment and technology. The NAB shows covers: broadcast TV, radio, production, post production, news gathering, streaming, cable TV, satellite TV, film restoration, data storage, data management, weather forecasting, industrial TV, FX, CGI, connected media, cybersecurity and more. NAB had 103,000 attendees from 161 countries and more than 1,806 exhibitors in 2016. There are also exhibitors in Las Vegas hotels not counted in the official convention center displays. In addition to the exhibitors' booths, there are lectures, panel discussions and workshops. In 2017, there will be over 200 of these sessions. Before 1991 the show had moved around to a number of cities: Atlanta (1990), Washington DC, Chicago, New York, Atlantic City, Dallas, Cleveland, Cincinnati, Los Angeles, Houston, San Francisco, St. Louis, White Sulfur Springs, W. Va., and once in West Baden Springs, Indiana

== History ==
The first NAB Show was held in 1923 in New York.

== Show highlights ==
=== 2008 ===
The 2008 NAB Show took place from April 11–17 in Las Vegas. The Show introduced a new technology pavilion titled Content Central, which featured forums and companies on emerging broadcast technology such as IPTV, Mobile content and a live 3D Transmission from Los Angeles. National Association of Broadcasters President and CEO David K. Rehr delivered his third State of the Industry Address, which was followed by the opening keynote from actor, producer and activist Tim Robbins where he decried a media "abyss" – "We are at an abyss as an industry and as a country".

=== 2009 ===
The 2009 NAB Show was held between April 18 and 23 at the Las Vegas Convention Center and Las Vegas Hilton. The show drew 83,842 registered attendees of which 23,232 were international attendees and 1,246 from news media. The exhibitors included established names including Adobe, Canon, JVC, Microsoft, SAT-GE, Tektronix, 3M, Altera, Cisco, Verizon and Xilinx and promising names including Qualstar, Bogen Imaging, Dayport, LEN, Trilithic and YellowBrix. Cheers and Frasier actor Kelsey Grammer received the inaugural Television Chairman's Award on April 20.

=== 2010 ===
The 2010 NAB Show was April 10 to 15 at the Las Vegas Convention Center. Emmy-nominated Big Bang Theory actor Jim Parsons was presented the NAB Television Chairman's Award for his role as theoretical physicist Sheldon Cooper. This was presented at the NAB Television Luncheon on April 12 at the Las Vegas Hilton. A Super Session took place on April 13 titled "Unboxing Advertising and Entertainment: Building a Transmedia Experience." The list of experts on the panel included writer/producer from Heroes and Lost Jesse Alexander, Ivan Askwith, director of strategy at creative agency Big Spaceship ("Tim Burton at MOMA," "The Million Baby Crawl"); Elan Lee, chief designer and founder Fourth Wall Studios (Watchmen, Kings ARGs); Mike Monello, cofounder and executive creative director at entertainment marketing agency Campfire (True Blood, "Discovery Channel: Shark Week); and Ian Sander, executive producer, Ghost Whisperer. 20th Century Fox Television executives Gary Newman and Dana Walden were the keynote speakers on April 12 discussing the opportunities and challenges facing TV studios at a time of technological upheaval. Los Angeles Times business reporter Joe Flint moderated. Comic book legend Stan Lee held a panel on April 14 and there was a significant 3D presence- 3ality demonstrated their 3D equipment at the Sony booth, and Element Technica, Panasonic, P+S Technik and Canon Broadcast made appearances as well. DreamWorks Animation head Jeffrey Katzenberg was booked last-minute for an "open conversation" about the impact 3D is having on the box office, sparked by the hasty decision to convert the Clash of the Titans remake into 3D.

=== 2011 ===
The 2011 NAB Show was April 9 to 14 at the Las Vegas Convention Center. This year, NAB highlighted that media consumption has become more digital and connected. This included discussion of TV everywhere strategies, mobile TV, and how the set top box will retain relevancy.[social TV] was another theme that cropped up at the show. This trend is closely tied with the adoption connected TV behaviour, and the use of social media.

=== 2012 ===
The 2012 NAB Show took place April 14 to 19 at the Las Vegas Convention Center. 2012 highlighted 4k video, Internet service provider content delivery and the evolution of special effects technology. Netflix unveiled the comeback of the television show Arrested Development and Betty White was inducted into the NAB Television Hall of Fame. The luncheons featured Garry Marshall, Bob Uecker and Donny Osmond. Stephen Dubner and Teri Hatcher opened the Show. James Cameron returned to the Show, Rob Legato discussed the films Hugo and Titanic and the Post|Production World Conference had the highly anticipated keynote of Steve Wozniak.

The "StartUp Loft" is an exhibit area at the NAB show that showcases new startup companies in technology, entertainment, and media. The StartUp Loft started at the 2012 NAB show.

=== 2013 ===
The 2013 NAB Show was April 6 to 11 at the Las Vegas Convention Center. NAB Show had its first ever 2nd screen (Second screen) Sunday presented by the 2nd Screen Society. Attendees also had the opportunity for a behind the scenes look at the production of the films Oblivion and Oz the Great and Powerful. The Television Luncheon, hosted by Nancy O'Dell, featured the induction of American Idol into the Television Hall of Fame with an appearance by Randy Jackson and a live performance by Chris Daughtry.

Chase Carey participated in the Show opening along with Bob Schieffer, Representative Greg Walden(OR-2) and Representative Dina Titus(NV-1). The 2013 NAB Show also featured a conversation between Senator Gordon H. Smith and Lowell McAdam, CEO of Verizon. Additional Speakers included: Charles F. Bolden, Julius Genachowski, Tom Green, Penn Jillette, Jon Landau, Dave Ramsey and John Tesh.

=== 2014 ===
The 2014 NAB Show was April 5 to 10 at the Las Vegas Convention Center. Over 98,000 attendees from 159 countries came to see exhibits from over 1,700 companies. The 2014 NAB show continued the "StartUp Loft" experiment.

=== 2016 ===
The 2016 NAB Show took place April 16 to 21 at the Las Vegas Convention Center. Attendance tops 103,000 and featured 1,874 companies. The Colorist Society International; a professional organization for film colorists was founded at this event.

=== 2017 ===
The 2017 NAB Show took place April 22 to 27 at the Las Vegas Convention Center With 103,000 attendees from more than 160 countries and 1,700+ exhibitors.

=== 2018 ===
The 2018 NAB Show took place April 7 to 12 at the Las Vegas Convention Center in Las Vegas, Nevada.

=== 2019 ===
The 2019 NAB Show took place April 8 to 11 at the Las Vegas Convention Center in Las Vegas, Nevada.

=== 2020 ===
The 2020 NAB was scheduled to take place April 18 to 22 at the Las Vegas Convention Center in Las Vegas, Nevada. However it was cancelled due to the COVID-19 pandemic in Nevada.

=== 2021 ===
In September 2020, the 2021 NAB Show was postponed to October 9–13, 2021 due to the COVID-19 pandemic, stating that "the pandemic remains a significant threat and the evidence suggests it will be well into next year before it could be under control in the U.S."

However, despite having announced plans to mandate that all attendees be fully-vaccinated for COVID-19, and implement other mitigations recommended by the Centers for Disease Control and Prevention (CDC), a number of major vendors (including Canon, Panasonic, Ross Video, and Sony) announced that they would not participate in the show. On September 15, 2021, the NAB Show was canceled once again, with organizers citing concerns over the Delta variant of COVID-19, and a desire to focus on the 2022 show.

=== 2022 ===
The NAB Show opened in Las Vegas at the Convention Center on April 23, 2022, returning to its traditional spring location after a two-year absence due to COVID-19. The National Association of Broadcasters (NAB) announced preliminary registered attendance of 52,468. New NAB president and CEO Curtis LeGeyt delivered a state of the industry address. On the policy side, LeGeyt vowed support for the trade group’s legacy broadcast membership. He called for Congress to take action “to rein in the gatekeeping ability of the Big Tech giants who are stifling the economics of local news.” He urged lawmaker and regulators to “modernize media ownership laws to reflect the realities of the marketplace,” and called on the FCC “to reorient how it thinks about broadcast policy more broadly.” He also encouraged congressional support for the Local Radio Freedom Act, which opposes a new performance fee on local radio stations.

== Notable firsts ==
- The first HDTV broadcast.
- The first presentation of the Red Digital Cinema Camera.
- In 1977 1" A and B format VTRs were shown, in Washington, D.C..
