= IBM 3592 =

Magnetic tape-based data storage format

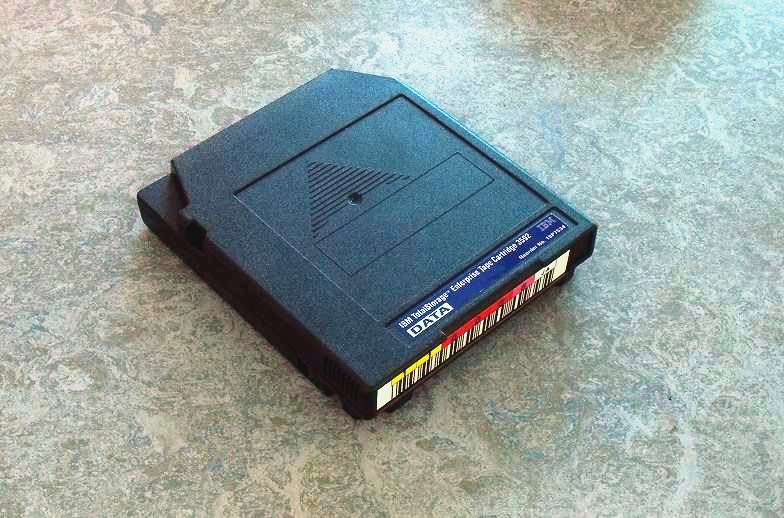
- 3592 tape cartridge
- Media type: Magnetic tape cartridge
- Developed by: IBM
- Usage: Archival storage
- Released: 2000; 26 years ago

The IBM 3592 is a series of enterprise-class tape drives and corresponding magnetic tape data storage media formats developed by IBM. The first drive, having the IBM product number 3592, was introduced under the nickname Jaguar. The next drive was the TS1120, also having the nickname Jaguar. As of October 2023, the latest and current drive is the TS1170. The 3592 line of tape drives and media is not compatible with the IBM 3590 series of drives, which it superseded. This series can store up to 50 TB of data (uncompressed) on a tape cartridge and has a native data transfer rate of up to 400 MB/s. In August 2023 IBM announced the TS1170 tape drive with 50TB cartridges, more than 2.5 times larger than LTO-9 cartridges.

Like the 3590 and 3480 before it, this tape format has half-inch tape spooled onto 4-by-5-by-1-inch data cartridges containing a single reel. A take-up reel is embedded inside the tape drive.

Since TS1120 all drives include built-in encryption processing, with platform software (for example, z/OS Security Server) managing encryption keys. Prior drives require server-based software to encrypt and decrypt tapes.

== Drives ==
	Gen 1	Gen 2	Gen 3	Gen 4	Gen 5	Gen 5A	Gen 6	Gen 7	Gen 8
Product Name	3592	TS1120	TS1130	TS1140	TS1150	TS1155	TS1160	TS1170	TS1180
Product Code	3592-J1A	3592-E05	3592-E06	3592-E07	3592-E08	3592-55F (FC); 3592-55E (Ethernet)	3592-60F	3952-70F (FB); 3952-70S (SAS)	TBA
Release date	2003	2005	2008	2011	2014	2017	2018	2023	TBA
Native/raw data capacity	300 GB	700 GB	1 TB	4 TB	10 TB	15 TB	20 TB	50 TB	80 TB
Max uncompressed speed (Note: Maximum uncompressed speeds valid for full-height drives. Half-height drives may not attain the same speed. Check the manufacturer's specifications.)	40 MB/s	100 MB/s	160 MB/s	250 MB/s	360 MB/s	360 MB/s	400 MB/s	400 MB/s	1000 MB/s
Compression capable?	Yes (3:1)								
WORM capable?	Yes								
Encryption capable?	No	Yes							
LTFS capable?	No			Yes					
Max. number of partitions	1 (no partitioning)			4					

Notes

- IBM Redbook with information on 3592 models (See sections 2.5 and 2.6)

== Cartridges ==
Unlike many other tape standards, the 3592 format allows an extensive reuse of cartridges already owned. Older generation tapes can be reformatted to higher capacities with every new drive generation, according to the table below. Cartridges are expected to operate in read-and-write mode across at least three drive generations, except in conjunction with technology leaps, e.g. the introduction of BaFe with JC cartridges or SrFe with JF. The observed media replacement rate in large archives is therefore lower than with most other standards.

Reformatting a cartridge means increasing its track density (only), as the linear bit density is limited by the tape coating. In the table below, a 'JA' type cartridge can be reformatted from 300 GB initially to 640 GB in the TS1130 drive. A later 'JB' type cartridge will carry 1 TB since its better coating also permits a higher linear bit density. Generally speaking, linear density is limited by material, semiconductor and signal processing technologies, whereas track density is limited by the servo technology that prevents track runout.

IBM 3592 tape cartridges				Capacity when formatted in							
Gen	Type	Code	Length	3592 J1A	TS1120	TS1130	TS1140	TS1150	TS1155	TS1160	TS1170
1	RW	JA	610 m	300 GB	500 GB	640 GB					
1	WORM	JW	610 m	300 GB	500 GB	640 GB					
1	RW, short	JJ	246 m	60 GB	100 GB	128 GB					
1	WORM, short	JR	246 m	60 GB	100 GB	128 GB					
2	RW	JB	825 m		700 GB	1 TB	1.6 TB				
2	WORM	JX	825 m		700 GB	1 TB	1.6 TB				
3	RW	JC	880 m				4 TB	7 TB	7 TB	7 TB	
3	WORM	JY	880 m				4 TB	7 TB	7 TB	7 TB	
3	RW, short	JK	146 m				500 GB	900 GB	900 GB	900 GB	
4	RW	JD	1,072 m					10 TB	15 TB	15 TB	
4	WORM	JZ	1,072 m					10 TB	15 TB	15 TB	
4	RW, short	JL	281 m					3 TB	3 TB	3 TB	
5	RW	JE	1163 m							20 TB	
5	WORM	JV	1163 m							20 TB	
5	RW, short	JM	320 m							5 TB	
6	RW	JF	1,337 m								50 TB

Notes

- The TS1140 drive can read, but not write, to Gen 1 cartridges of any format, and Gen 2 cartridges in TS1120 format. It can read and write to Gen 2 cartridges in TS1130 format.
- The TS1150, TS1155, & TS1160 drives cannot read or write to any Gen 1 or Gen 2 cartridges.
- The TS1170 drive can only use Gen 6 (JF) cartridges. It does not support previous generation 3592 cartridges.
- 3592 media datasheet
- IBM 3592 Cartridges and Compatibility
- Redbook: IBM Tape Library Guide for Open Systems - Aug 2024

== See also ==
- Magnetic-tape data storage
- Linear Tape-Open, another popular tape format
