= IBM 3590 =

IBM series of tape drives and media

The IBM 3590 is a series of tape drives and corresponding magnetic tape data storage media formats developed by IBM. The first drive, having the IBM product number 3590, was introduced in 1995 under the nickname Magstar. The 3590 series of tape drives and media are not compatible with the IBM 3592 line of drives that replaced it. They can store up to 60 GB of data (uncompressed). This family superseded the IBM 3480 Family of tape drives popular in 1980s and 1990s.

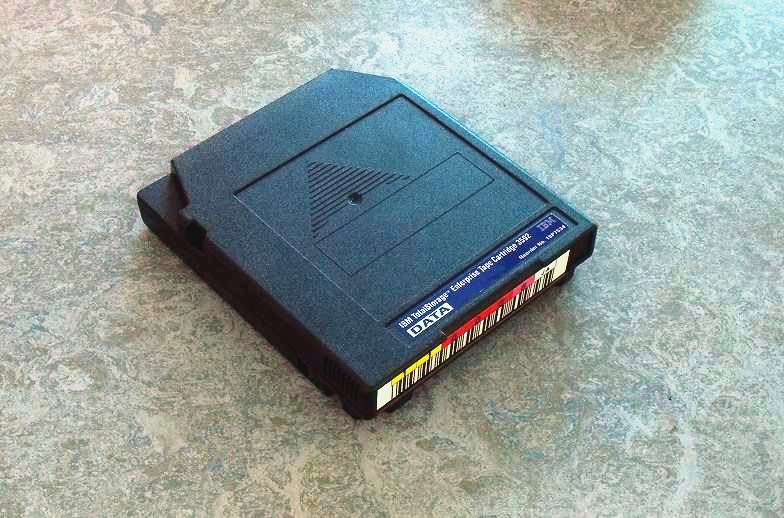
3592 Series tape

Like the 3480 and 3592 formats, this tape format has half inch tape spooled onto 4-by-5-by-1 inch data cartridges containing a single reel. A takeup reel is embedded inside the tape drive. Because of their speed, reliability, durability and low media cost, the 3590 tape drives are still in high demand. A hallmark of the genre is interchangeability: Tapes recorded with one tape drive are generally readable on another drive, even if the tape drives were built by different manufacturers. Magstar tapes and drives exist in 128, 256 and 384-track versions.

The tape is written at the drive's defined density and can only be read in a drive of the same model type or a higher version model. Thus, a tape written in the H drive can only be read in an H drive. A tape written in an E drive can be read in an E drive and an H drive. A tape written in a B drive can be read in a B, E or H drive.

Unlike DLT, LTO or 3592 drive variants, the 3590 drive is not capable of writing at a lower density than its native density.

There is often confusion in naming of the media and drives, the drives usually being referred to as 3590B, 3590E and 3590H. There are two types of media, the standard length media often being referred to as 3590 or 3590B, and the extended length media often being referred to as 3590E. Both types of media can be written in all three drives, the 3590E in the Ultra variant of the 3590B drive.

== Drives ==
- 3590 B Model (3590 B11/B1A), 128 tracks, up to 9 MB/s native data rate. Announced April 1995.
- 3590 E Model (3590 E11/E1A), 256 tracks, up to 14 MB/s native data rate. Announced April 1999.
- 3590 H Model (3590 H11/H1A), 384 tracks, up to 14 MB/s native data rate. Announced July 2002.

=== Notes ===
- IBM's 3590 A14 archive product page
- IBM Redbook for original 3590 model

== Media ==
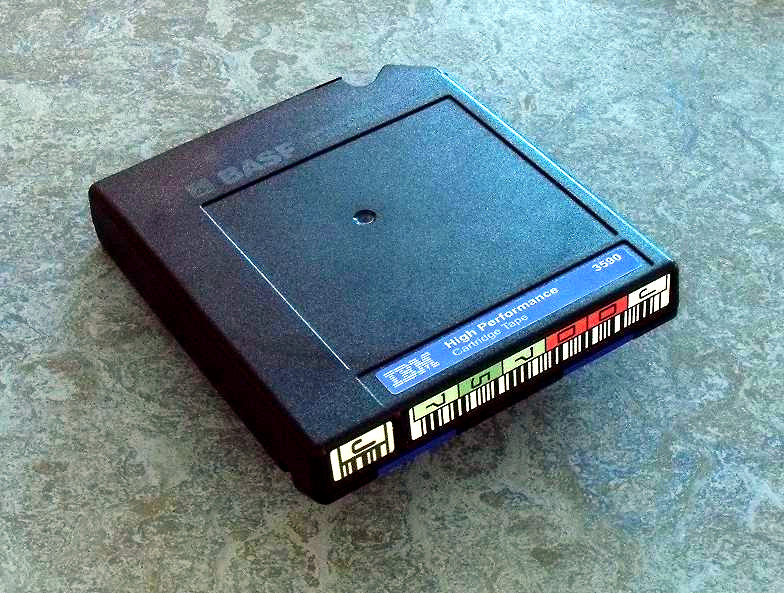
3590 High Performance tape

	Tape length (m)	3590 B Model	3590 E Model	3590 H Model
"High-Performance" cartridge	320 m	10 GB	20 GB	30 GB
"Extended High-Performance" cartridge	634 m	20 GB	40 GB	60 GB

=== Notes ===
- The 320 m long "High Performance" (normal) 3590 cartridges use Polyethylene terephthalate (PET) as the base material.
- The 634 m long "Extended" 3590 cartridges use Polyethylene naphthalate (PEN) as the base material.
- 3590 media datasheet
