= IBM 7340 =

Magnetic tape storage format

The IBM 7340 "Hypertape" system is a magnetic tape data storage format designed to work with the IBM 7074, 7080 and 7090 computers that was introduced in 1961 and withdrawn in 1971.

As a technology, it deviated in several ways from the then dominant IBM 7 track system. It distinguished itself by having higher capacity, faster data transfer speed, faster load times, and lower wear on the tape. It achieved this by using tape that was twice as wide (1 vs. 1/2 inch), preloaded on two reels, and held in a large cassette capable of holding up to 40 million six-bit characters per cassette depending upon record length.

The system comprised a two-channel control unit, the IBM 7640 (Figure 1), and one or more IBM 7340 tape drives (Figure 2). Ten 7340s can be attached to each 7640 channel. ... The tape used is 0.1-mil oxide on a 1-mil polyester base. It is one inch wide, with 1800 feet on a reel. Written across the tape are ten bits; eight are information bits, and two are check bits used for error correction during reading. These two check bits, in conjunction with a signal-strength monitor, provide detection of all errors and correction of all single- and 33 of 45 possible double-bit errors. In alpha-numeric mode, six of the information tracks are utilized per character. In packed-numeric mode, two four-bit characters are written side by side across the tape, as shown in Figure 3. The character density is 1511/inch, and tape speed is 112.5 inches/sec.

== Specs ==
- Two reel cartridge - 17in x 10.2in x 2.2in / 43cm x 26cm x 5.6cm
- 1 inch wide tape
- 10 track linear recording (6 data bits, 2 checksum bits, 2 tracks not used)
- Capacity: 26.24 million 6-bit characters when formatted with 7.400 records of 3,600 characters.
- Speed: 170,000 characters/second

== See also ==
- www-03.ibm.com - IBM 7340 hypertape drive
- - Modern Mechanix: Cartridge Tape System Is Fast, Compact (Dec, 1961)
- CSDL | IEEE Computer Society (PDF) - IBM 7340 HYPERTAPE DRIVE
