= IBM 726 =

The IBM 726 was IBM's first magnetic tape unit. It was a dual magnetic tape reader/recorder developed for use with the IBM 701 and announced on May 21, 1952. This model of tape unit was shipped with the IBM 701 from December 20, 1952 until February 28, 1955.

The tape had seven parallel tracks, six for data (called a copy group, not a character) and one to maintain parity. Tapes were recorded in odd parity, to ensure at least one bit transition per copy group as well as for error checking.

The 726 concurrently handled two reels of tape, and there were two 726 units in an IBM 701 system.

Tracks	6 Data, 1 parity
Copy groups/inch	100 copy groups/inch
Tape speed	75 Inches/sec
Transfer rate	7500 copy groups/sec
End of record gap	1 Inch - 100 chars - 16.67 words
Start time	10 ms
Stop time	10 ms
Width of tape	1/2 inch
Length of reel	1 200 feet
Composition	Cellulose acetate base
