= Digital Linear Tape =

Magnetic tape-based data storage technology

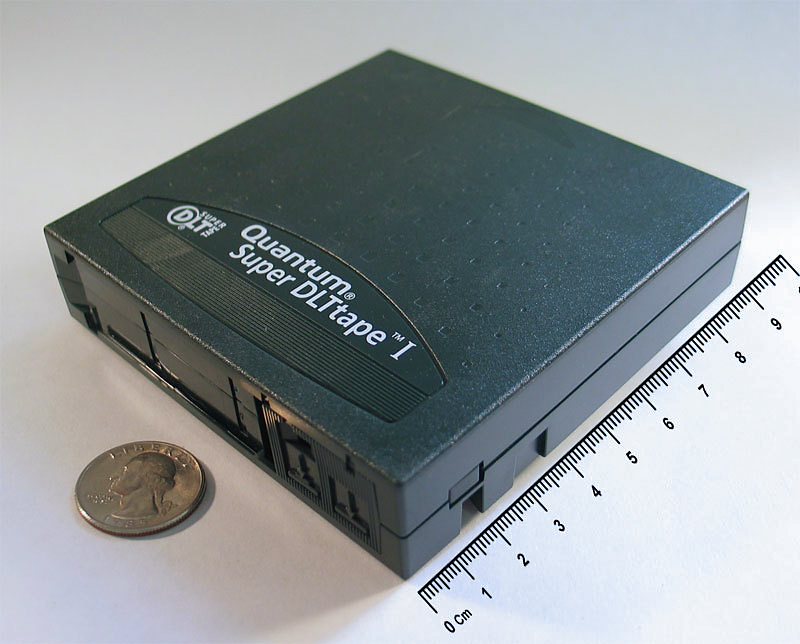
- A Super DLT I tape cartridge
- Media type: Magnetic tape cartridge
- Developed by: Digital Equipment Corporation
- Usage: Data storage
- Released: 1984; 42 years ago

Digital Linear Tape (DLT; previously called CompacTape) is a magnetic-tape data storage technology developed by Digital Equipment Corporation (DEC) from 1984 onwards. In 1994, the technology was purchased by Quantum Corporation, who manufactured drives and licensed the technology and trademark. A variant with higher capacity is called Super DLT (SDLT). The lower cost "value line" was initially manufactured by Benchmark Storage Innovations under license from Quantum. Quantum acquired Benchmark in 2002.

In 2007, Quantum stopped developing DLT drives, shifting its strategy to LTO.

== History ==
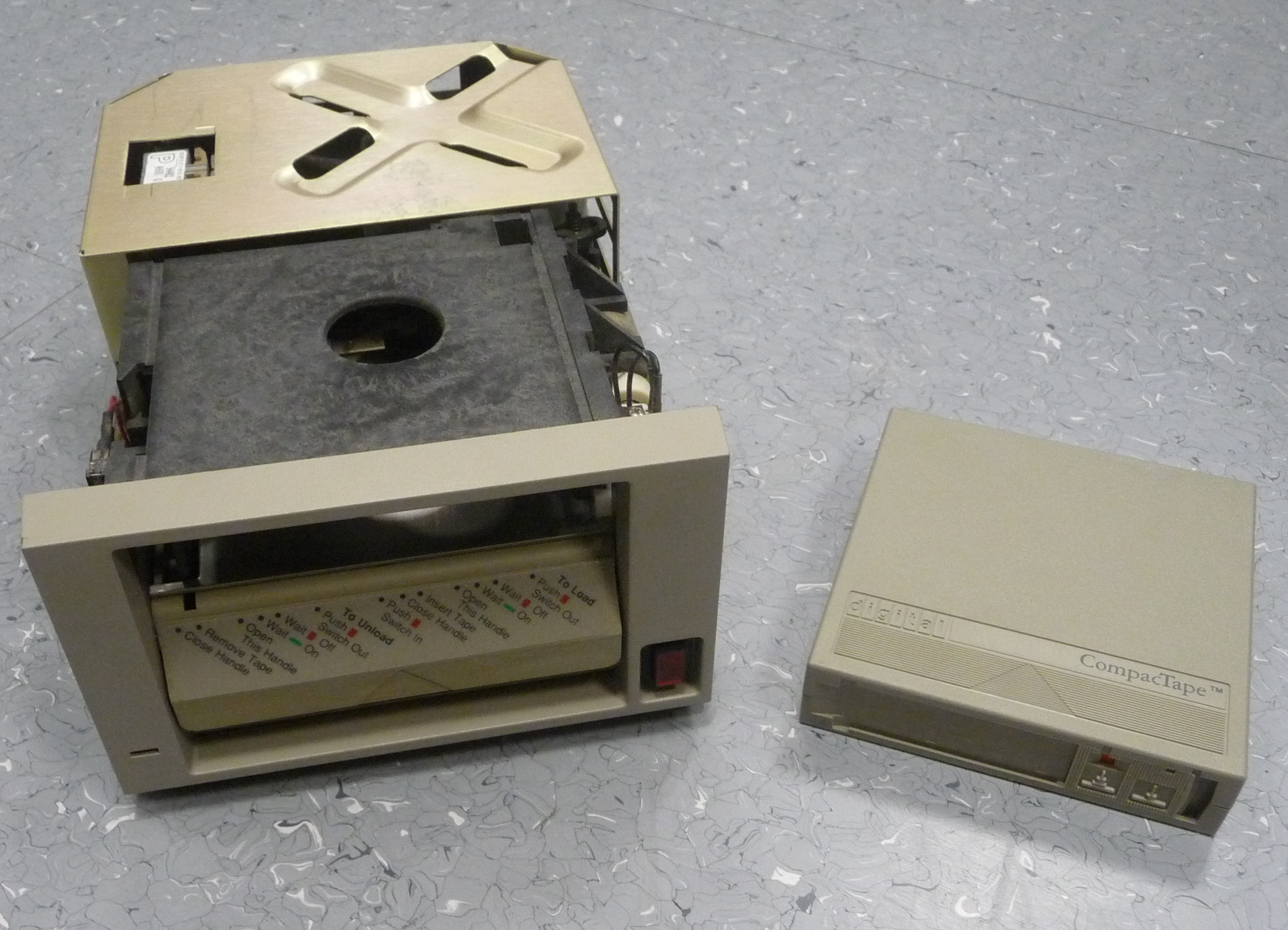
DEC TK50 drive and cartridge

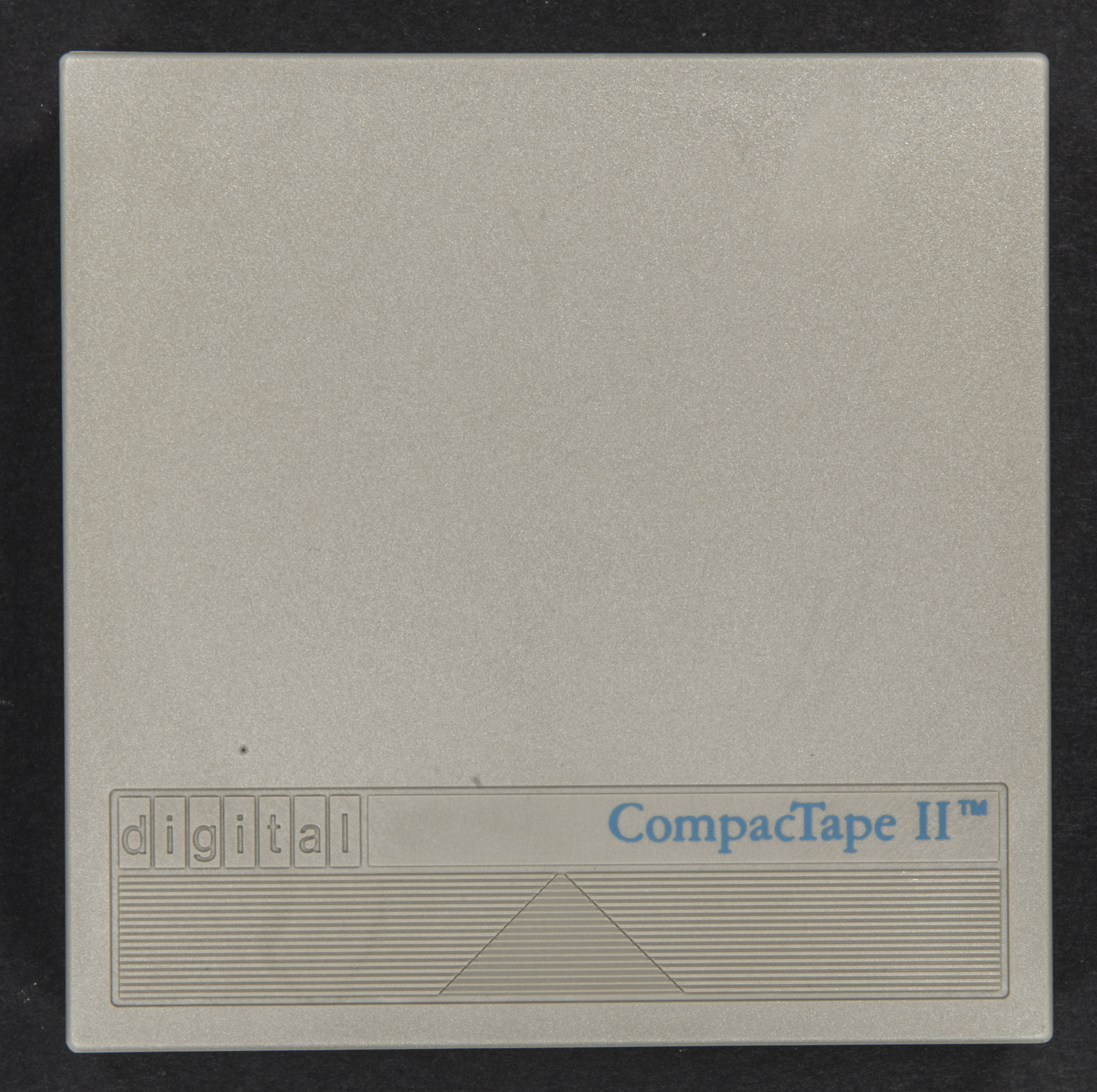
CompacTape II

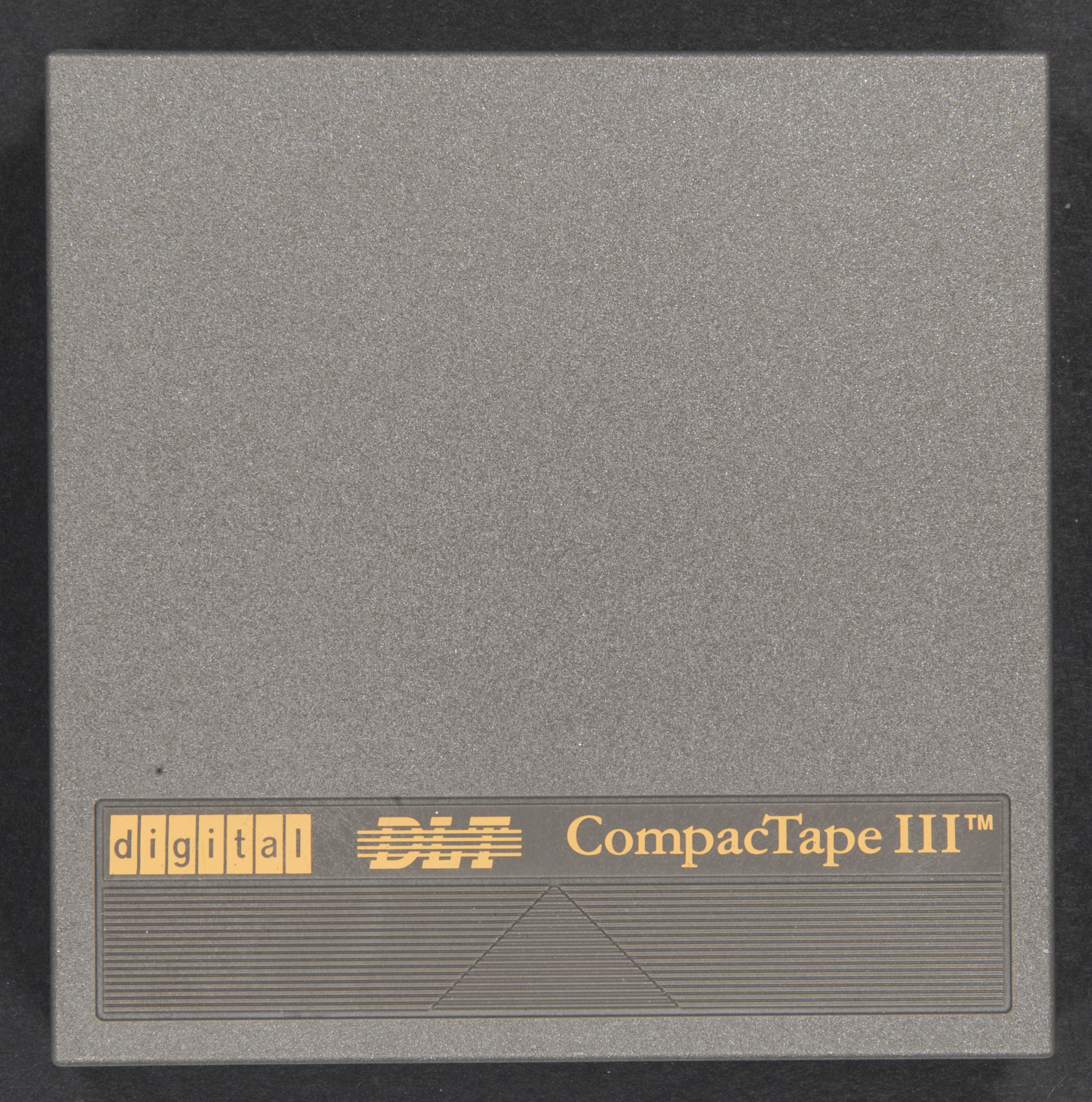
CompacTape III (DLT)

DEC launched the TK50 tape drive for the MicroVAX II and PDP-11 minicomputers in 1984. This used 22-track CompacTape I cartridges, storing 94 MB per cartridge. The TK50 was superseded in 1987 by the TK70 drive and the 48-track CompacTape II cartridge, capable of storing 294 MB. In 1989, the CompacTape III (later DLTtape III) format was introduced, increasing the number of tracks to 128 and capacity to 2.6 GB. Later drives into the early 1990s improved the data density of the DLTtape III cartridge, up to 10 GB. The DLTtape IV cartridge was introduced by Quantum in 1994, with increased tape length and data density, initially offering 20 GB per tape. Super DLTtape, originally capable of up to 110 GB, was launched in 2001.

== Technology ==
DLT uses linear serpentine recording with multiple tracks on half-inch (12.7 mm) wide tape. The cartridges contain a single reel and the tape is pulled out of the cartridge by means of a leader tape attached to the take-up reel inside the drive. The drive leader tape is buckled to the cartridge leader during the load process. Tape speed and tension are controlled electronically via the reel motors; there is no capstan. The tape is guided by 4 to 6 rollers that touch only the back side of the tape. Tape material is metal particle tape (MP/AMP).

SDLT adds an optical servo system that reads servo patterns on the back of the tape to keep the data tracks on the front of the tape correctly aligned with the read/write heads. This is important for newer tape media, which have very thin, dense data tracks; 256, 384 and 768 data tracks on a 1/2-inch-wide (13 mm) tape are available.

DLT7000 and 8000 tilt the head forward and backward to reduce crosstalk between adjacent tracks through azimuth; this is called Symmetric Phase Recording.

All (S)DLT drives support hardware data compression. The often-used compression factor of 2:1 is optimistic and generally only achievable for text data; a more realistic factor for a file system is 1.3:1 to 1.5:1, although drive compression applied to pre-compressed data can actually make the written data larger than having compression turned off in the tape drive.

Media are guaranteed for 30 years of data retention under specified environmental conditions; they are easily damaged by mishandling (dropping or improper packaging during shipment.)

Manufacturers of cartridges for the DLT/SDLT market are Fujifilm, Hitachi/Maxell and Imation. VStape is made by Sony. All other companies/brands (even Quantum) are contractors and/or resellers of these companies.

A new naming convention took effect in 2005, calling the performance line DLT-S and the value line DLT-V.

DLT includes Write Once Read Many (WORM) capability.

In February 2007, Quantum stopped developing the next generations of DLT drives (S5 and V5) after insufficient market acceptance of the S4 and V4 drives, shifting its drive strategy to LTO.

== Generations ==
Comparison of "supertape" capacities, including SDLT.

=== Drives ===
Drive	Capacity (GB)	Interface	Data Rate (MB/s)	Date	Media
TK50/TZ30	0.1	proprietary/SCSI	0.045	1984	CT I
TK70	0.3	proprietary	0.045	1987	CT II
THZ01/DLT260/Tx85	2.6	DSSI/SCSI	0.8	1991	DLT III
THZ02/DLT600/Tx86	6	DSSI/SCSI	0.8	1991	DLT III
DLT2000/Tx87	10	Fast SCSI-2	1.25	1993	DLT III
DLT2000XT	15	Fast SCSI-2	1.25	1995	DLT IIIXT
DLT4000/Tx88	20	Fast SCSI-2	1.5	1994	DLT IV
DLT7000/Tx89	35	Fast/Wide SCSI-2	5	1996	DLT IV
DLT8000	40	Fast/Wide SCSI-2	6	1999	DLT IV
SDLT 220	110	Ultra-2-Wide SCSI	11	1998	SDLT I
SDLT 320	160	Ultra-2-Wide SCSI	16	2002	SDLT I
SDLT 600	300	Ultra-160 SCSI/FC 2Gb	36	2004	SDLT II
SDLT 600A	300	GbE (FTP, HTTP)	36	2005	SDLT II
DLT-S4	800	Ultra-320 SCSI/FC 4Gb/SAS	60	2006	S4
DLT-S4A	800	GbE (FTP, HTTP)	60	2007	S4
Value line
DLT1	40	Fast/Wide SCSI-2	3	1999	DLT IV
DLT-VS80	40	Fast/Wide SCSI-2	3	2001	DLT IV
DLT-VS160	80	Ultra-2-Wide SCSI	8	2003	VS1
DLT-V4	160	Ultra-160 SCSI/SATA/USB	10	2005	VS1

=== Media ===
Name	Formats (GB)	Colour	Supported by (ro=read only)
CompacTape I	0.1	Light Grey	TK50/TZ30, TK70 (ro)
CompacTape II	0.3	Dark Grey	TK70
DLTtape III	2.6, 6, 10	Light brown	DLT260/600, DLT2000/2000XT/4000/7000
DLTtape IIIXT	15	White	DLT2000XT/4000/7000/8000
DLTtape IV	20, 35, 40^{[a]}	Dark brown	DLT4000/7000/8000, DLT1/DLT-VS80^{[a]}, SDLT220/320 (ro)
Cleaning Tape III	20 cleans	Beige	DLT2000/2000XT/4000/7000/8000
SDLTtape I	110, 160	Dark green	SDLT220/320, SDLT600 (ro), DLT-S4 (ro)
SDLTtape II	300	Dark blue	SDLT600, DLT-S4 (ro)
DLTtape S4	800	Dark purple	DLT-S4
SDLT Cleaning Tape	20 cleans	Light grey	SDLT220/320/600, DLT-S4
DLTtape VS1	80, 160	Ivory/Black	VS160, DLT-V4, SDLT600 (ro)
DLT VS Cleaning Tape	20 cleans	Brown	DLT1, DLT-VS80
DLT VS160 Cleaning Tape	20 cleans	Light grey	DLT-VS160, DLT-V4

^{a} DLTtape IV can support both DLT4000/7000/8000 and DLT1/DLT-VS80 for full functions; once DLTtape IV media has been written to or formatted in a DLT7000/8000 drive, this media cannot be read, written to, or formatted in a DLT1/DLT-VS80 drive unless it is degaussed. Once the media has been written to or formatted in a DLT4000 drive, the media cannot be written to or formatted in a DLT1/DLT-VS80 drive unless it is degaussed but it can be read. This is because the DLT1/VS series use a different recording format that is not fully supported by the other family.

Tapes written in value series drives can typically be read in (and often written to) higher end drives of a similar vintage, so long as the drive's technical specifications contain interoperability options.

== See also ==
- Symmetric Phase Recording
