= IBM 3480 family =

Magnetic tape data storage format developed by IBM

The 3480 tape format is a magnetic tape data storage format developed by IBM. The tape is one-half inch (13 mm) wide and is packaged in a 4 in × 5 in × 1 in (102 mm × 127 mm × 25 mm) cartridge. The cartridge contains a single reel; the takeup reel is inside the tape drive.

Because of their speed, reliability, durability and low media cost, these tapes and tape drives are still in high demand. A hallmark of the genre is transferability. Tapes recorded with one tape drive are generally readable on another drive, even if the tape drives were built by different manufacturers.

Tape drives conforming with the IBM 3480 product family specification were manufactured by a variety of vendors from 1984 to 2004. Core manufacturers included IBM, Fujitsu, M4 Data, Overland Data, StorageTek and Victor Data Systems (VDS). Various models of these tape drives were also marketed under other brands, including DEC, MP Tapes, Philips, Plasmon, Qualstar, Tandem, and Xcerta.

IBM designated all versions of 3480 and 3490E tape drives as members of the 3480 Product Family.

== Interfaces ==
Tape drives built for the 3480 formats were initially designed for IBM System/370 computers. Therefore, the first 3480 tape drives communicated through a bus and tag interface. Later models were able to take advantage of ESCON and high voltage SCSI interfaces. The advent of the SCSI interface made it possible to connect 3480 family tape drives to personal computers, which enabled mainframe-to-PC data exchange.

== 3480 ==
The first 3480 tape drives were introduced in 1984. The IBM 3480 was the first tape drive to employ magnetoresistive (MR) heads and the first to use chromium dioxide tape.

One way the format stands out from earlier formats is that the gap between blocks is too small for the drive to stop the tape within it, so the drive must have a write buffer. When the drive does stop the tape during writing because the host is not sending data, it overshoots the gap, backs up the tape, and stops it well before the gap. During the seconds this is happening, if the host has resumed sending data, the drive stores it in the buffer. It then accelerates the tape, reaching speed before the place where the next block needs to be written, and proceeds to write the buffered data there.

Because it is not necessary to accelerate and decelerate the tape within the interblock gap, a 3480 tape drive does not need vacuum columns, and that allows it to be much smaller than tape drives for earlier formats.

It is also distinguished by a relatively high data transfer rate: 3 megabytes per second. This is because it is able to read and write linear data across 18 recording tracks simultaneously, or 38,000 bytes per inch (15,000 bytes/cm) of tape. IBM's prior technology employed 9 recording tracks with a data density of 6,250 bytes per inch (2,460 bytes/cm) of tape, so the 3480 format was greeted as a major breakthrough. The IBM 3480 cartridge stores 200 megabytes in a modest 4 in × 5 in (10 cm × 13 cm) cartridge compared to the previous technology's 140 megabytes on a 10.5-inch (270 mm) diameter (2,400-foot (730 m) length) reel of 1/2-inch (13 mm) tape. The 3480 and its successors are streaming drives.

While IBM offered 3480 tape drives with bus and tag interfaces, other manufacturers sold models with SCSI interfaces.

== 3480 IDRC ==
In 1986, IBM added a hardware-based data compression option: Improved Data Recording Capability (IDRC). A 3480 tape drive with IDRC can record up to 400 megabytes on a single tape. The 3480 IDRC format is also commonly known as the 3490 recording format.

A 3480 tape drive with IDRC uses the same data cartridges as a standard 3480 tape drive. It can read and write standard 3480 tapes.

== 3490E ==
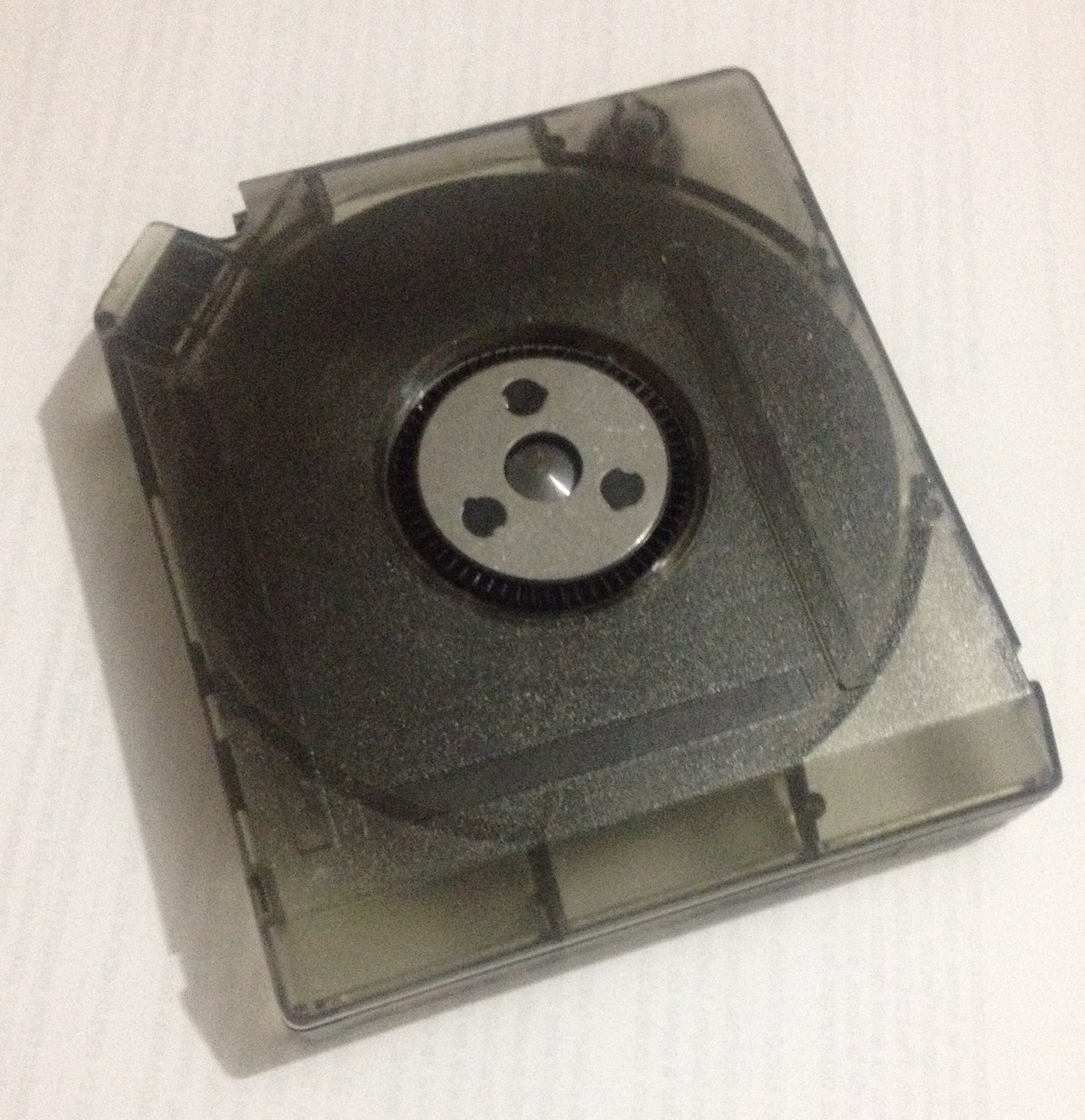
A 36-track, 3490E Tape Cartridge

IBM introduced the 3490E tape drive in 1991. Its 36-track head is able to record 800 megabytes of data on a single tape. The IDRC option allows it to record up to 2400 megabytes on a single extended tape. The last 36-track tape drive manufacturer, VDS, discontinued production late in 2004, after IBM announced that it would no longer supply 36-track thin film tape heads.

3490E tape drives were available from a variety of manufacturers with bus and tag, ESCON, or high voltage SCSI interfaces, and are capable of data transfer speeds up to 20MB per second.

3490E data cartridges are the same dimensions as 3480 cartridges and the tape media is the same, only longer. 3490E tape is optimized for 36-track recording heads, instead of 18-track recording heads. Nevertheless, some 3480 tape drives can record on 3490E media.

Some 3490E tape drives are able to read tapes recorded by 3480 tape drives. Others can also write tapes that can be read by 3480 tape drives. But many 3490E tape drives can only read/write 36-track tapes.

Evolution of the IBM 3480 Product Family

Format	Intro Date	Capacity (MB)	Tracks
3480	1984	200	18
3480 IDRC	1986	400	18
3490E	1991	800	36
3490E IDRC	1992	2400	36

== Beyond 3480 ==
The 3480 magnetic tape format family has been superseded by the IBM 3590 "Magstar" magnetic tape format, which is distinguished by much higher transfer rates and densities. Tape head sizes at this writing: 128-track, 256-track and 384-track. The 3590 format was succeeded by the IBM 3592 "Jaguar" format.
