= Data8 =

Magnetic tape storage format

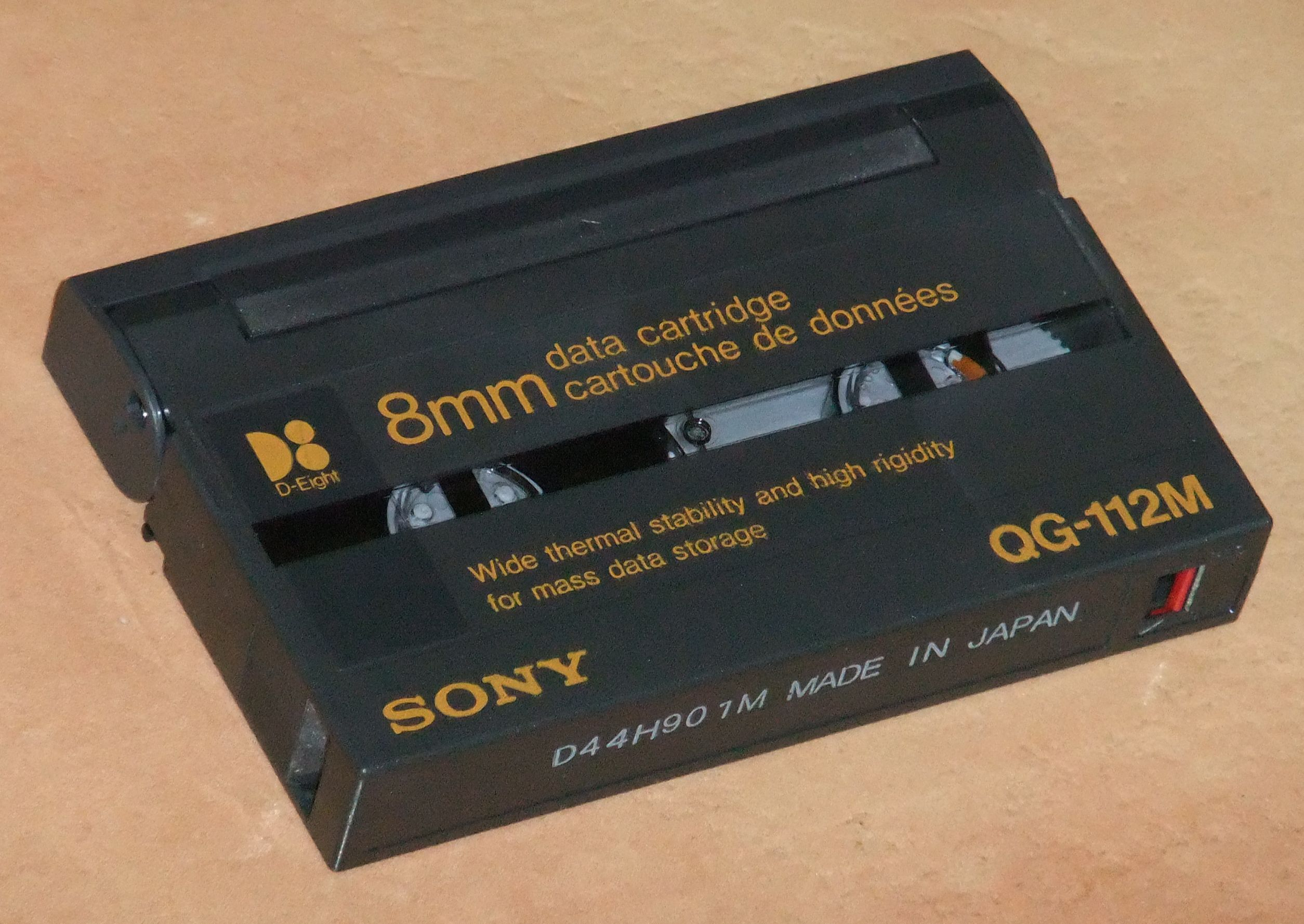
- Media type: Magnetic cassette tape
- Encoding: Real-time
- Read mechanism: Helical scan
- Write mechanism: Helical scan
- Developed by: Exabyte Corporation
- Usage: Data storage
- Extended from: 8 mm video format
- Released: 1987; 39 years ago

The 8 mm backup format is a discontinued magnetic tape data storage format used in computer systems, pioneered by Exabyte Corporation. It is also known as Data8, often abbreviated to D8 and is written as D-Eight on some Sony-branded media. Such systems can back up up to 60 GB of data depending on configuration. The cassettes have the same dimensions and construction as the cassettes used in 8 mm video format recorders and camcorders.

Until the advent of AIT, Exabyte was the sole vendor of 8 mm format tape drives. The company was formed with the aim of taking the 8 mm video format and making it suitable for data storage. They did so by building a reliable mechanism and data format that used the common 8 mm helical scan videotape technology that was available then.

Exabyte's first 8 mm tape drive was made available in 1987. This was followed up with their Mammoth tape drive in 1996, and the Mammoth-2 (M2) in 1999.

Exabyte's drive mechanisms were frequently rebranded and integrated into UNIX systems.

Metal Particle (MP) Data8 cartridges are essentially identical to Video8 cassettes and can be used for video recording. Similarly, Video8 cassettes will work in Data8 drives capable of using MP tape.

== Generations ==
NOTE: The AIT and VXA formats and some other less common formats also use 8 mm wide tape, but are completely incompatible.

=== Compatibility between tapes and drives and native capacities (GB) ===
	MP				AME				AME w/ SmartClean		
	15 m	54 m	112 m	160 m	22 m	45 m	125 m	170 m	75 m	150 m	225 m
EXB-8200	0.3	1.2	2.4								
EXB-8205	0.3	1.2	2.4								
EXB-8205 XL	0.3	1.2	2.4	3.5							
EXB-8500	0.6	2.4	5								
EXB-8505	0.6	2.4	5								
EXB-8505 XL	0.6	2.4	5	7							
EXB-8700	0.6	2.4	5	7							
Eliant 820	0.6	2.5	5	7							
Mammoth (EXB-8900)	RO	RO	RO	RO	2.5	Y	14	20			
Mammoth-LT	RO	RO	RO	RO	2.5	Y	14				
Mammoth-2					6	12	33	45	20	40	60

Legend:

- RO - The tape drive can read this tape, but not write. (Read Only)
- Y - The tape drive can read and write this tape, but its size is not known.
- Numbered entries indicate the native storage capacity (in GB) for this combination of tape and drive.

=== Exabyte 8 mm ===
These drives use metal particle (MP) tape.

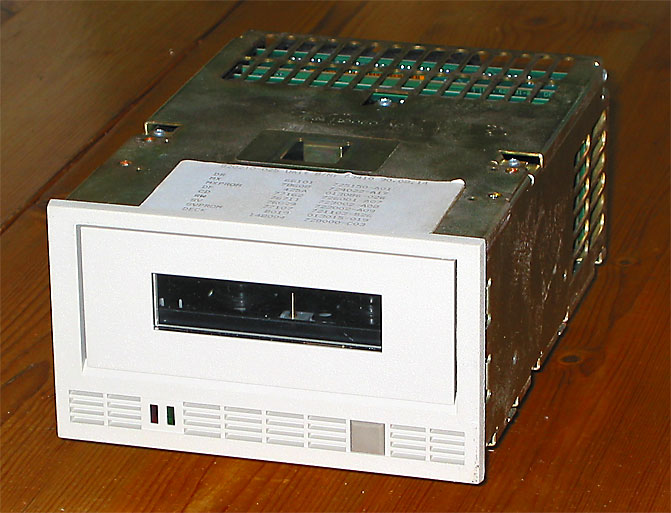
EXB-8200

- 1987—EXB-8200
  - Full-height form factor
  - 246 kB/s data transfer rate
  - EXB-8200SX model features high-speed search
  - EXB-8205: Up to 5.0 GB on one 112 m data cartridge (assuming 2:1 compression ratio)
  - EXB-8205XL: Up to 7.0 GB on one 160 m data cartridge (assuming 2:1 compression ratio)
- 1990—EXB-8500
  - Full-height form factor
  - 500 kB/s data transfer rate
  - EXB-8500c model features hardware data compression
- 1992—EXB-8505
  - Half-height form factor
  - 500 kB/s data transfer rate (uncompressed) / 1.0 MB/s data transfer rate (assuming a 2:1 compression ratio)
  - Up to 10.0 GB on one 112 m data cartridge (assuming 2:1 compression ratio)
- 1994—EXB-8505XL
  - Half-height form factor
  - 500 kB/s data transfer rate (uncompressed) / 1.0 MB/s data transfer rate (assuming a 2:1 compression ratio)
  - Up to 14.0 GB on one 160 m XL data cartridge (assuming 2:1 compression ratio)
- 1995—EXB-8700
  - Tabletop (top-loading) form factor
  - 8700 model included generic backup software
  - 8700LT model included no software
  - 8700SW included Cheyenne backup software
- 1998—Eliant 820
  - Half-height form factor

=== Mammoth ===
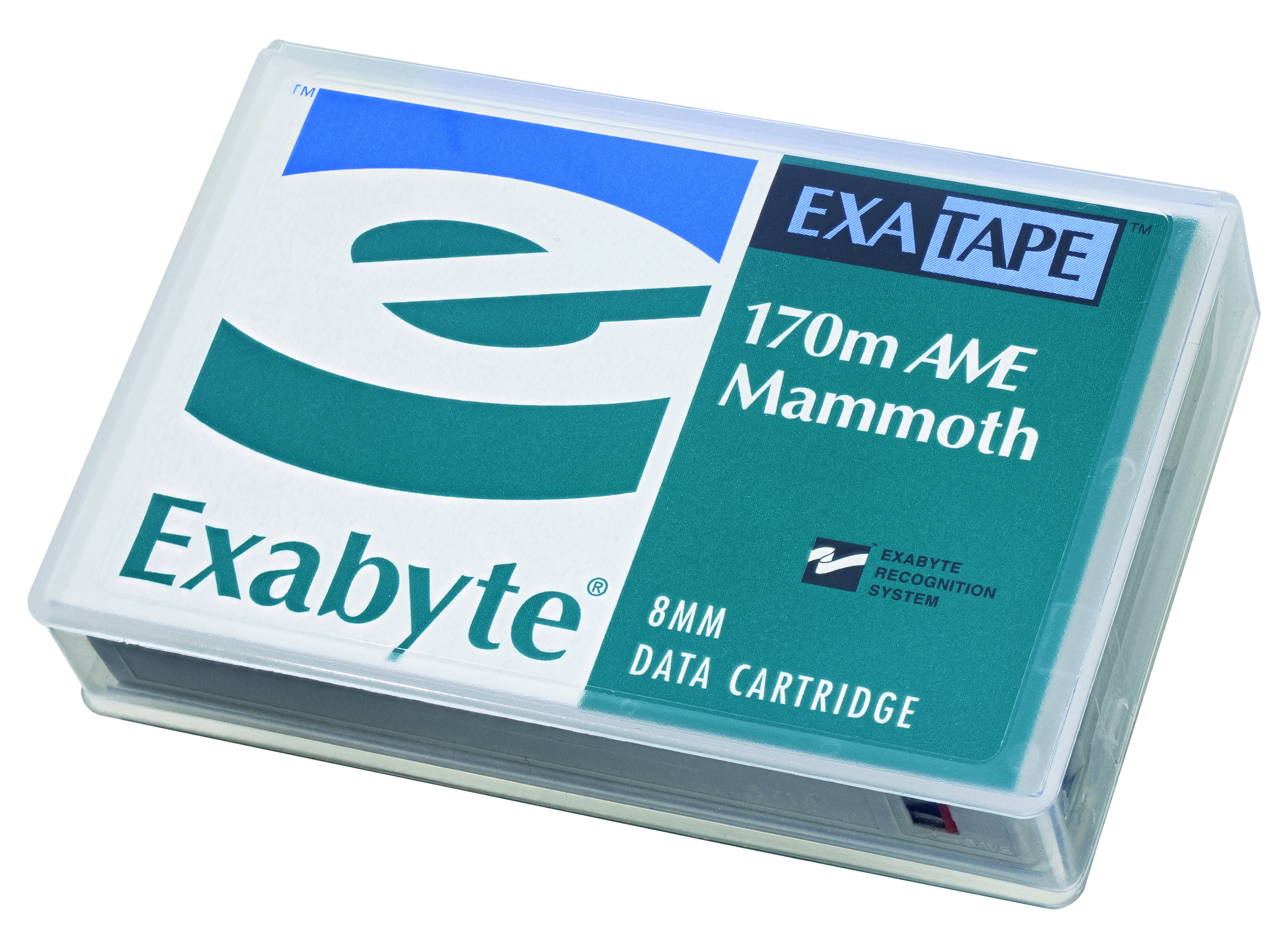
Exabyte AME tape

These drives use Advanced Metal Evaporated (AME) tape, but could also read (but not write) MP tapes.

- 1996—EXB-8900 Mammoth
  - 3 MB/s data transfer rate
  - LCD on drive displayed drive status
- 1999—Mammoth-LT
  - No LCD

=== Mammoth-2 (M2) ===
These drives used Advanced Metal Evaporated (AME) tape with a 2 m integrated cleaning tape header called Smart Clean.

- 1999—Mammoth-2
  - 12 MB/s data transfer rate
  - 4.6 cm/s tape speed during normal read/write operations
  - 1.6 m/s tape speed during search and rewind operations
  - 17 s load time, from insertion to ready
  - ALDC hardware data compression, 1 kB compression buffer

== See also ==
- Digital Data Storage
