= TR5 =

TR5 or some variant thereof, may represent:

- Triumph TR5, a British sports car
- Triumph TR5 Trophy, a British motorcycle
- TR.5 aero engine, see Avro Canada Orenda
- Travan TR-5, computer tape storage cartridge
- TR5, a postal district in the TR postcode area
- Tomb Raider: Chronicles, the fifth computer game in the Tomb Raider series
