= TR7 =

TR7 or some variant thereof may represent:

- Tomáš Rosický, a Czech footballer.
- Triumph TR7
- TR-7, see Travan
- TR7, a postal district in the TR postcode area
