= Travan =

Magnetic tape cartridge design

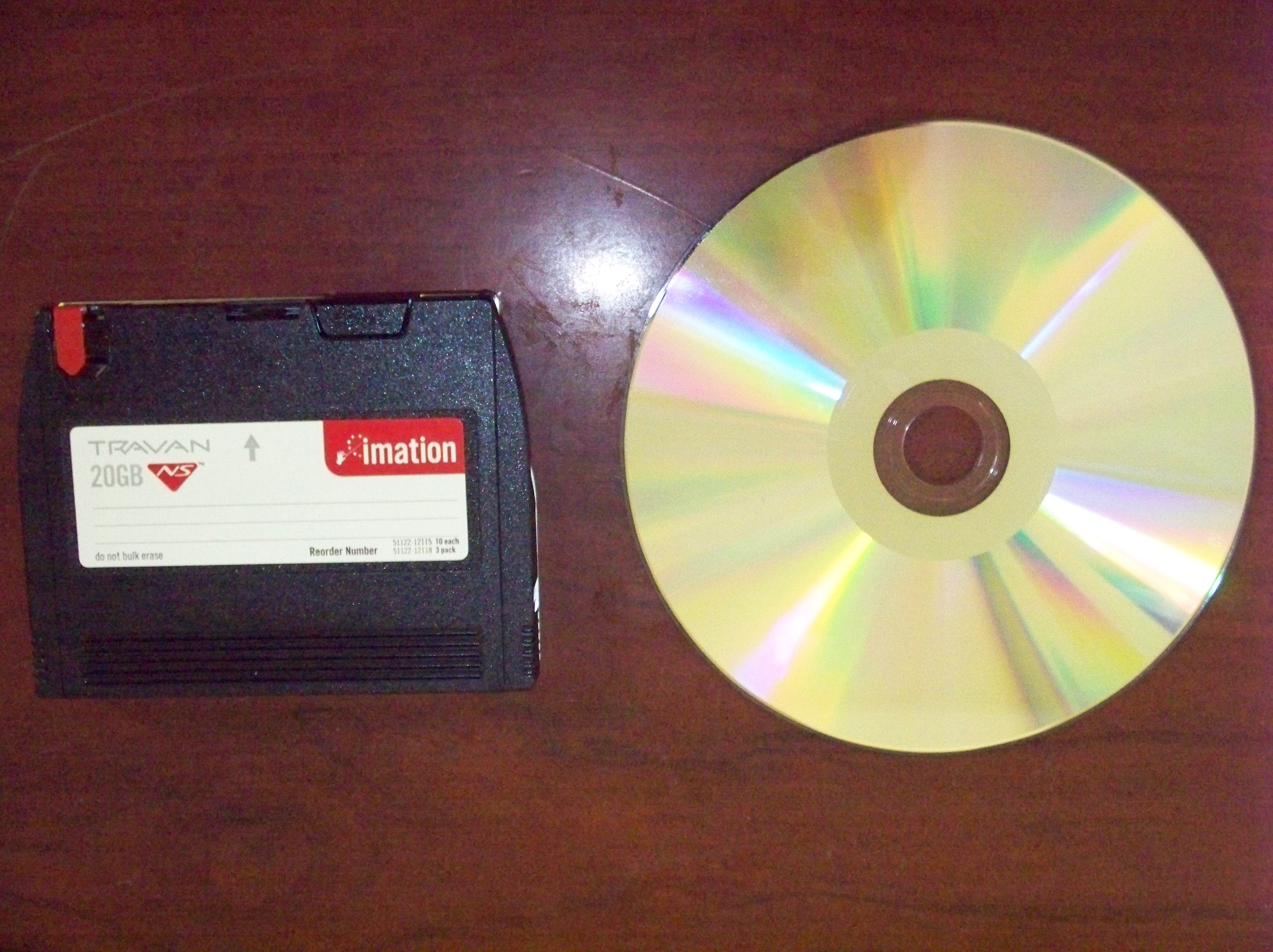
A Travan tape cartridge shown next to a CD-R disc.

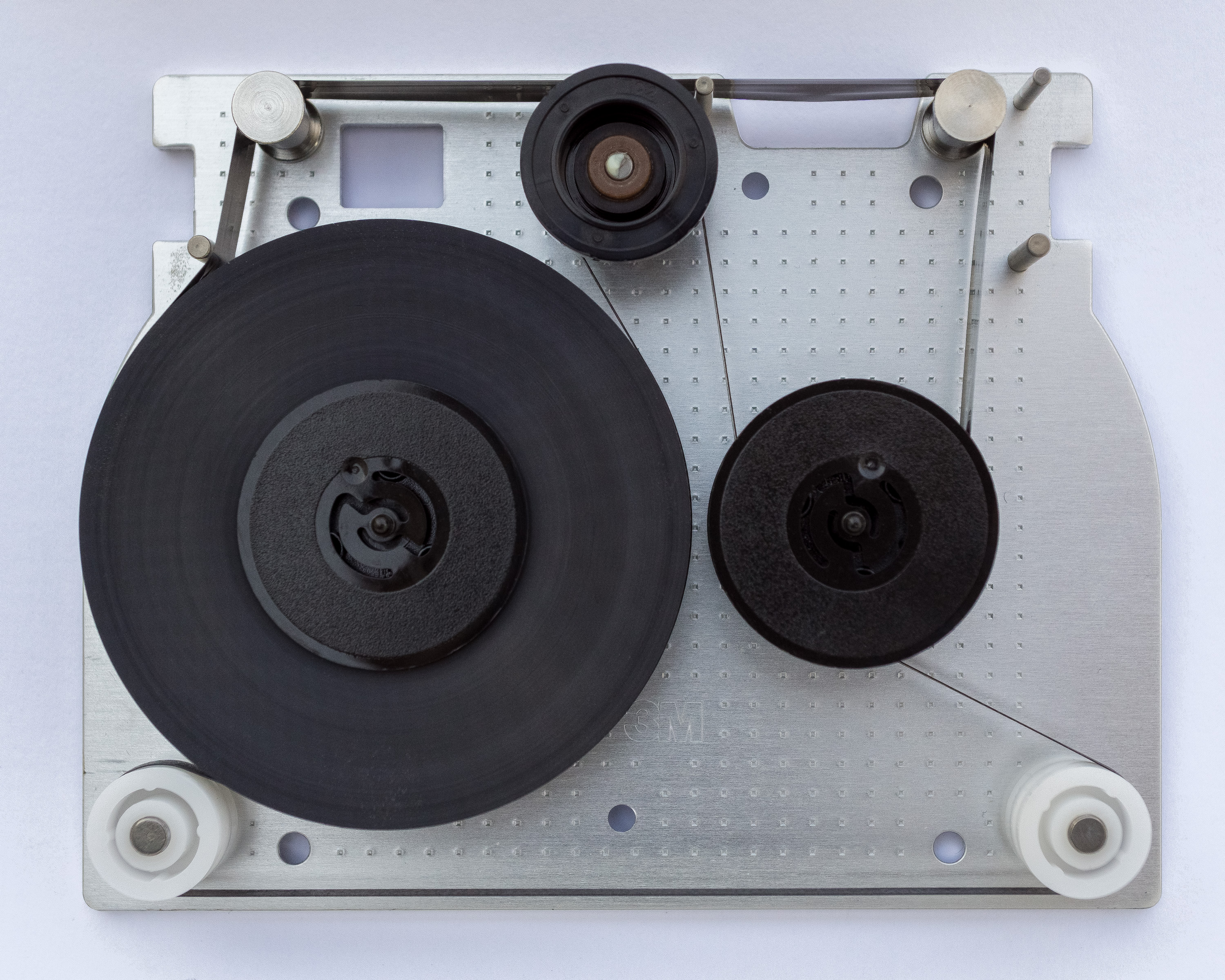
The internals of a 400 MB Travan tape cartridge.

Travan is an 8 mm magnetic tape cartridge design developed by the 3M company, used for the storage of data in computer backups and mass storage. Over time, subsequent versions of Travan cartridges and drives have been developed that provide greater data capacity, while retaining the standard 8 mm width and 750' length. Travan is standardized under the QIC body. HP Colorado, Iomega DittoMax and AIWA Bolt are proprietary versions of the Travan format.

The Travan format competed mainly against the DDS, AIT, and VXA formats.

== Generations ==
Generation	TR-1	TR-3	TR-4	TR-5/NS20	TR-7
Release date	1995	1995	1997	1998	2002
Data capacity	400 MB	1.6 GB	4 GB	10 GB	20 GB
Max speed (MB/s)	0.25	0.5	1.2	2	4
Media format	QIC-80	QIC-3020	QIC-3095	QIC-3220-MC	Travan 640
Min tape length (ft)	750	750	740	740	750
Tape tracks	36	50	72	108	108
Encoding	MFM	MFM	RLL(1,7)	RLL(1,7)	VR^{2} (PRML)
Tape type	Co-γFe_{2}O_{3}	Co-γFe_{2}O_{3}	Co-γFe_{2}O_{3}	Metal Particle	Metal Particle
Coercivity (Oe)	550	900	900	1650	1650
Recording density (ftpi)	14,700	44,250	50,800	79,800	96,000
Data density (bpi)	14,700	44,250	67,733	106,400	192,000

=== TR-1 ===
- Travan TR-1 cartridges offer a 400 MB native capacity with a 0.25 MB/s transfer rate using the QIC-80 media format.

=== TR-2 ===
- TR-2 was designed by 3M, but they never marketed it.
- TR-2 cartridges were designed to have an 800 MB native capacity with a 0.25 MB/s transfer rate using the QIC-3010 media format.
- The spec called for 50 tracks across the tape, with a recording density of 22,125 flux transitions per inch (ftpi).

=== TR-3 ===
- Travan TR-3 cartridges offer a 1.6 GB native capacity with a 0.5 MB/s transfer rate using the QIC-3020 media format.

=== TR-4 ===
- Travan TR-4 cartridges offer a 4 GB native capacity using the QIC-3095 media format.
- Travan 8 GB cartridges offer a 4 GB native capacity with a 1.2 MB/s transfer rate.
- Travan NS8 cartridges offer a 4 GB native capacity with a 1.2 MB/s transfer rate.
- Imation HP Colorado 5 GB is a 460 ft (140 m) variation on the TR-4 standard. It offered 2.5 GB native capacity, 1 MB/s transfer rate.

=== TR-5 ===
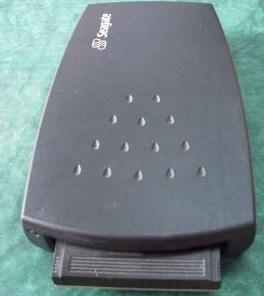
An external, USB, NS20 Travan tape drive.

- Travan NS20 cartridges offer a 10 GB native capacity with a 2 MB/s transfer rate.
- Travan 20 GB cartridges offer a 10 GB native capacity with a 2 MB/s transfer rate.

=== TR-7 ===
- Travan 40 GB cartridges offer a 20 GB native capacity with a 4 MB/s transfer rate.

== Technology ==
Travan uses a linear track technology, with data written onto individual tracks over several successive passes. Fully reading or writing a tape to full capacity may require moving the tape from reel to reel many times. The tape is not attached to the hubs, but is wrapped and held by friction. The tape is prevented from coming off at the ends using small holes punched in the tape, which are detected by optical sensors in the tape drive using a 45-degree mirror inside and a window on the side the cartridge.

It also uses an indirect tension-band drive system, consisting of an elastic band that presses on the exterior of both reels, and also over an idler wheel on the edge of the case. A motor in the drive contacts the idler to move the tape. Because the reels wind and unwind at unequal speeds there is always some slippage occurring when the tape is in motion; frequent retensioning of the tape (achieved by winding the tape fully forwards and then backwards at high speed) is required to prevent this problem. Old tapes used many times tend to have a visibly marked stripe down the center of the tape where the band has pressed into the tape.

Unlike some competing technologies such as Digital Linear Tape (DLT) and Linear Tape-Open (LTO), Travan technology does not automatically verify data after writing. Data verification must be done separately by the computer operator, to verify data was written successfully. If a separate verify operation is not performed after each backup, it is possible for backups to be found to be corrupt and unusable when the tapes need to be used.
