= Tallgrass Technologies =

Tallgrass Technologies Corporation
- Type: Private
- Industry: Computers
- Founded: December 1980; 45 years ago in Kansas City, Missouri
- Founder: David M. Allen
- Defunct: 1993; 33 years ago
- Fate: Acquired by Exabyte Corporation
- Products: Hard disk drives

Tallgrass Technologies Corporation was an American computer hardware company that was the first to offer a hard disk drive product for the IBM PC in 1981. Tallgrass was a Kansas City based microcomputer hardware and software company founded in December 1980 by David M. Allen. The hard disk drive product was initially sold in Computerland stores, alongside the original IBM PC. Tallgrass added tape-backup systems to its product line in 1982.

Because IBM shipped its PCs for almost two years without a factory hard-drive option, the availability of Tallgrass hard drives allowed third-party developers to introduce professional software products requiring high storage capacity and speed to the PC market earlier than would have otherwise been possible. This availability supported the growth of the PC market.

Tallgrass was one of Seagate's earliest customers, initially purchasing ST-506 drives from Shugart Technology before that company changed its name to Seagate. The Tallgrass product was designed around the ST-506 hard drive, which required a separate controller between the drive and the computer (unlike hard drives today.) Tallgrass also briefly bought ST-506 drives from Seagate's licensee, Texas Instruments. Later, Tallgrass bought most of its drives from Miniscribe and for a while was Miniscribe's largest customer.

== History ==
While at a previous employer, Allen developed a floppy disk controller and, in early 1980, a prototype hard disk controller. Both designs used an all-digital phase-locked loop data separator that he patented. Both controller designs used GCR-encoding, which supported slightly higher linear densities and enabled higher storage capacities than conventional MFM. During a recession, in December 1980 Allen left that employer to form Tallgrass, with his former employer's permission to take the controller designs and another employee, a programmer, with him. Tallgrass' initial revenue stream in 1981 was provided by a contract with SofTech Microsystems for development of the 68000 interpreter for the UCSD Pascal software system. Allen had previously written the 6809 interpreter for UCSD Pascal, before starting Tallgrass.

By the spring of 1981, the hard disk controller design was complete. Tallgrass initially tried marketing Allen's hard disk controller alone, to system manufacturers. In mid-1981, it was decided to instead market a complete, external hard-disk subsystem (hard-drive + controller) to computer dealers. Tallgrass developed subsystems for the Xerox 820 and Alpha Microsystems computers, and was working on an Apple IIe version when IBM announced the PC in August 1981.

Jim Fricke, a partner in the Lenexa, Kansas Computerland store, gave Allen access to their IBM PC demonstrator when it arrived on a Friday, a few weeks before the PCs became available for sale. Allen needed to develop an interface-card and a device-driver to give the PC a connection to and access to the Tallgrass subsystem.

Allen discovered Tallgrass had already developed the IBM PC DOS device driver. As part of the previous development of its subsystem for the Alpha Microsystems computer, Tallgrass had developed a device driver for Seattle Computer Products' 86-DOS operating system. 86-DOS was renamed PC DOS when Microsoft bought the rights and licensed it to IBM. With information gleaned from Computerland's IBM PC demonstrator, Allen designed and built a prototype interface card over the weekend and successfully tested the card and the PC DOS driver in the store on the following Monday.

Tallgrass was able to supply its hard disk subsystems for the PC, in production quantities in November 1981, almost immediately after IBM started revenue shipments of PCs, in October. This was because Tallgrass' product was already in production and needed only the simple interface card and PC DOS driver software to attach it to the IBM PC. The same Computerland store's other partner, Bruce Burdick, was a member of the Computerland chain's New Products Committee and helped get the Tallgrass product embraced by Computerland nationwide.

With IBM's entry into the market, Allen invited a friend, Steven B. Volk to join Tallgrass as Executive V.P. of Sales and Marketing. Volk was Tallgrass' fourth employee, hired at the end of 1981 after he finished dental school. Volk assembled a sales organization and started an advertising campaign, initially incorporating pictures of macaws that he and his wife raised in their home.

With the support of Computerland and helped by high gross margins of up to 35%, Tallgrass grew very rapidly. Early in 1982, Allen added a tape backup product to the product line, another first for PCs. This first tape-backup product used out-sourced Archive Corporation tape drive mechanisms and 3M cartridges. Later, Tallgrass opened a facility in Boulder, Co., to develop and manufacture smaller tape-backup drives. Allen's patented, all-digital phase-locked loop circuit was used once again, this time in controlling the speed of the tape-drive's motor.

The manufacturing cost of the disk and tape controllers was low because Allen's unorthodox controller design was shared by both disk and tape and, being 100% digital including the data-separator, it was easily reduced to a single LSI microchip. Gross revenue peaked in mid-1985 at an annualized rate of $70M and there were 400 employees at the start 1986. By this time significant competition had arrived and Tallgrass' sales had plateaued.

To finance Volk's plan to revive sales growth with an enlarged marketing push, Allen accepted the overtures of venture capital. In mid-1986, Gateway Associates L.P. in St. Louis took the lead and brought in the major investor, Reimer and Koger Assoc., pension fund advisor for KPERS (the Kansas Public Employees Retirement System.) Sales continued to falter and profits sagged while management and investors disagreed over a course of action.

In mid-1987 the investors forced Allen out and took control of the company. Volk left later the same year to go to PrairieTek. Allen brought the investors a $4M buyout offer from CMS Enhancements, a California competitor. A letter of intent was signed in July but allowed to expire in August. By November 1987 the investments reportedly totaled $7M, employment was down to 130, and annual sales revenue far below $40M.

Tallgrass had 1992 sales of $9.3M and was "said to be profitable." In 1993 the investors sold what was left of Tallgrass to Exabyte Corporation for $1.5M. By that time, KPERS investments in Tallgrass totaled over $14M.

Not long after the acquisition, Exabyte sold the "Tallgrass Technologies" name to the former Tallgrass V.P. of International Sales, Jim Worrell, who then renamed his own import/export company using the Tallgrass name. Today his company has new ownership and a different charter but continues operating under the Tallgrass Technologies LLC name.
