= Advanced Intelligent Tape =

Discontinued magnetic tape data storage format

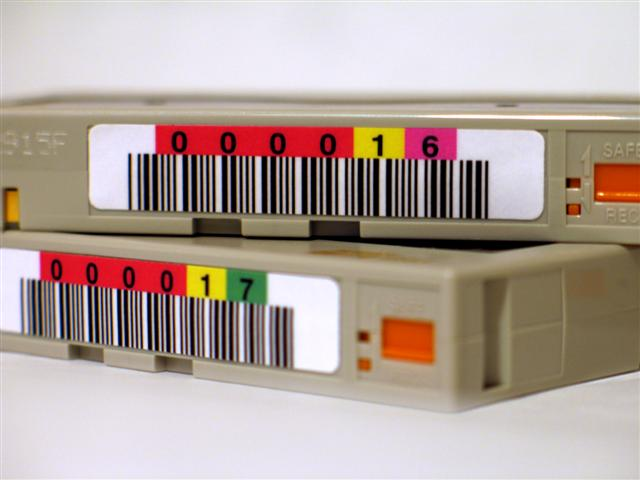
AIT tapes

Advanced Intelligent Tape (AIT) is a discontinued high-speed, high-capacity magnetic-tape data storage format developed and controlled by Sony. It was introduced in 1996 to use Advanced Metal Evaporated (AME) technology. It competed mainly against the DLT, LTO, DAT/DDS, and VXA formats. AIT uses 8 mm tape in a cassette similar to Video8. Super AIT (SAIT) is a higher-capacity variant using wider half-inch (1/2"; 12.7 mm) tape in a larger, single-spool cartridge. Both AIT and SAIT use the helical scan method of reading and writing to the tape.

== Form factors ==
AIT technology was available in two form factors:

- AIT – 8 mm, dual-reel cartridge, similar to Sony's 8 mm videotape products and Exabyte's 8 mm data tape products.
- SAIT – 1/2" (12.7 mm), single-reel cartridge, similar to DLT and LTO.

In March 2010, Sony announced the discontinuation of the AIT product line and renewed collaboration with Hewlett-Packard on further development of the DDS tape format,

== Compatibility ==
One of the most compelling features of the AIT format is that many generations are both backwards and forwards compatible. This allows multiple generations of tape drives to both read and write to multiple generations of tape media.

== AIT generations ==
Generation	AIT-E Turbo	AIT-1	AIT-1 Turbo	AIT-2	AIT-2 Turbo
Release date	2004	1996	2004	1999	
Native capacity (GB)	20	25, 35	40	36, 50	80
Max speed (MB/s)	6	3, 4	6	6	12
Encoding				Trellis coding for partial response (TCPR)	
RPM		4800		6400	
Tape length (m)	98	170, 230	186	170, 230	186
Tape thickness (μm)	6.6	7.0, 5.3	6.6	7.0, 5.3	6.6

=== AIT-1 ===
- Original specification's data capacity up to 25 GB native and up to 65 GB compressed, with a data transfer speed of 3 MB/s.
- Extended length tape, introduced in 1999 gave additional capacity, 35 GB.
- Speed increased to 4 MB/s in 2001.
- Turbo variant, introduced in 2004, is 50% faster (6 MB/s) and holds 40 GB.
- A budget version, AIT-E Turbo, was also introduced in 2004 to compete with DDS.
- SATA version of AIT-1 Turbo available in 2006.

=== AIT-2 ===
- Doubled capacity and transfer speed
- WORM technology introduced
- Turbo variant has 100% higher capacity and is 100% faster (same speed as AIT-3)
- Turbo variant introduced R-MIC technology
- SATA version of AIT-2 Turbo available in 2006
- Higher-capacity TAIT2-80N (Turbo) 80 GB native.

Generation	AIT-3	AIT-3Ex	AIT-4	AIT-5	AIT-6
Release date	2001	2006	2005	2006	cancelled
Native capacity (GB)	100	150	200	400	800
Max speed (MB/s)	12	18	24	24	
Encoding			Extended TC-PRML	Turbo-coded modulation	Turbo-coded modulation
Tape length (m)	230		246	246	
Tape thickness (μm)	5.3		4.8	4.8	
WORM-capable	Yes	Yes	Yes	Yes	

=== AIT-3 ===
- Doubled capacity and transfer speed
- Ex variant has 50% higher capacity and is 50% faster

=== AIT-4 ===
- Doubled capacity and transfer speed
- New tape formulation, AME-2
- Not compatible with previous generations

=== AIT-5 ===
- Available September 27, 2006
- Announced July 2006, hardware and media expected "in the fall".
- Doubled capacity (via halved tracked pitch to 2.2 μm), maintained transfer speed.
- Backwards compatible with AIT-3, AIT-3Ex, AIT-4
- New tape formulation, AME-3, which uses finer cobalt particles, resulting in SNR gain of 1 dB compared with AIT-4/AME-2.
- A switch to GMR head technology (Flux Guide GMR).

== SAIT generations ==
Comparison of "supertape" capacities, including SAIT

Generation	SAIT-1	SAIT-2	SAIT-3	SAIT-4
Release date	2003	2006	cancelled	cancelled
Native capacity (GB)	500	800	2000	4000
Max speed (MB/s)	30	45	120	240
Tape length (m)	600	640		
Tape thickness (μm)		8.6		

=== SAIT-1 ===
- Highest-capacity tape cartridge from 2003 to 2006. Displaced by DLT-S4 (800 GB).

The AIT format was developed and is controlled by Sony.

=== SAIT-2 ===
Released in 2006 by Sony, available only in libraries, 800 GB native and 45 MB/s sustained transfer rate.

== Notes ==
- Data capacity and speed numbers above are for uncompressed data. Sony assumes a 2× or 2.6× compression factor in their marketing material.
- According to Sony, "All future products are based on technology projections."

== Technical features ==
=== AME ===
Advanced Metal Evaporated is a different formulation of tape media.

=== MIC ===
Memory-in-Cassette is a 16–64 KB memory chip in the cartridge that keeps relevant information about the data on the tape to allow quicker access. The drive did not have to read the whole tape until it came across the file required like a file index.

=== R-MIC ===
Remote-Memory in Cassette. Like MIC, except it does not require physical contact.

=== WORM ===
Write once read many functionality, useful for archive keeping.
