= Digital Data Storage =

Computer data storage technology based on magnetic tape

- Media type: Magnetic cassette tape
- Encoding: Lossless real-time
- Read mechanism: Rotating head
- Write mechanism: Rotating head, helical scan
- Developed by: Sony
- Usage: Data storage
- Extended from: Digital Audio Tape
- Released: 1989; 37 years ago

Digital Data Storage (DDS) is a computer data storage technology based upon the Digital Audio Tape (DAT) format that was developed during the 1980s. DDS is primarily intended for use as off-line storage, especially for generating backup copies of working data.

== Design ==
A DDS cartridge uses tape with a width of 3.81mm, with the exception of the latest formats, DAT-160 and DAT-320, both which use 8mm wide tape. Initially, the tape was 60 meters (197 feet) or 90 meters (295 ft.) in length. Advancements in materials technology have allowed the length to be increased significantly in successive versions. A DDS tape drive uses helical scan recording, the same process used by a video cassette recorder (VCR).

Backward compatibility between newer drives and older cartridges is not assured; the compatibility matrices provided by manufacturers will need to be consulted. Typically drives can read and write tapes in the prior generation format, with most (but not all) also able to read and write tapes from two generations prior. Notice in HP's article that newer tape standards do not simply consist of longer tapes; with DDS-2, for example, the track was narrower than with DDS-1.

At one time, DDS competed against the Linear Tape-Open (LTO), Advanced Intelligent Tape (AIT), VXA, and Travan formats. However, AIT, Travan and VXA are no longer mainstream, and the capacity of LTO has far exceeded that of the most recent DDS standard, DDS-320.

== History ==
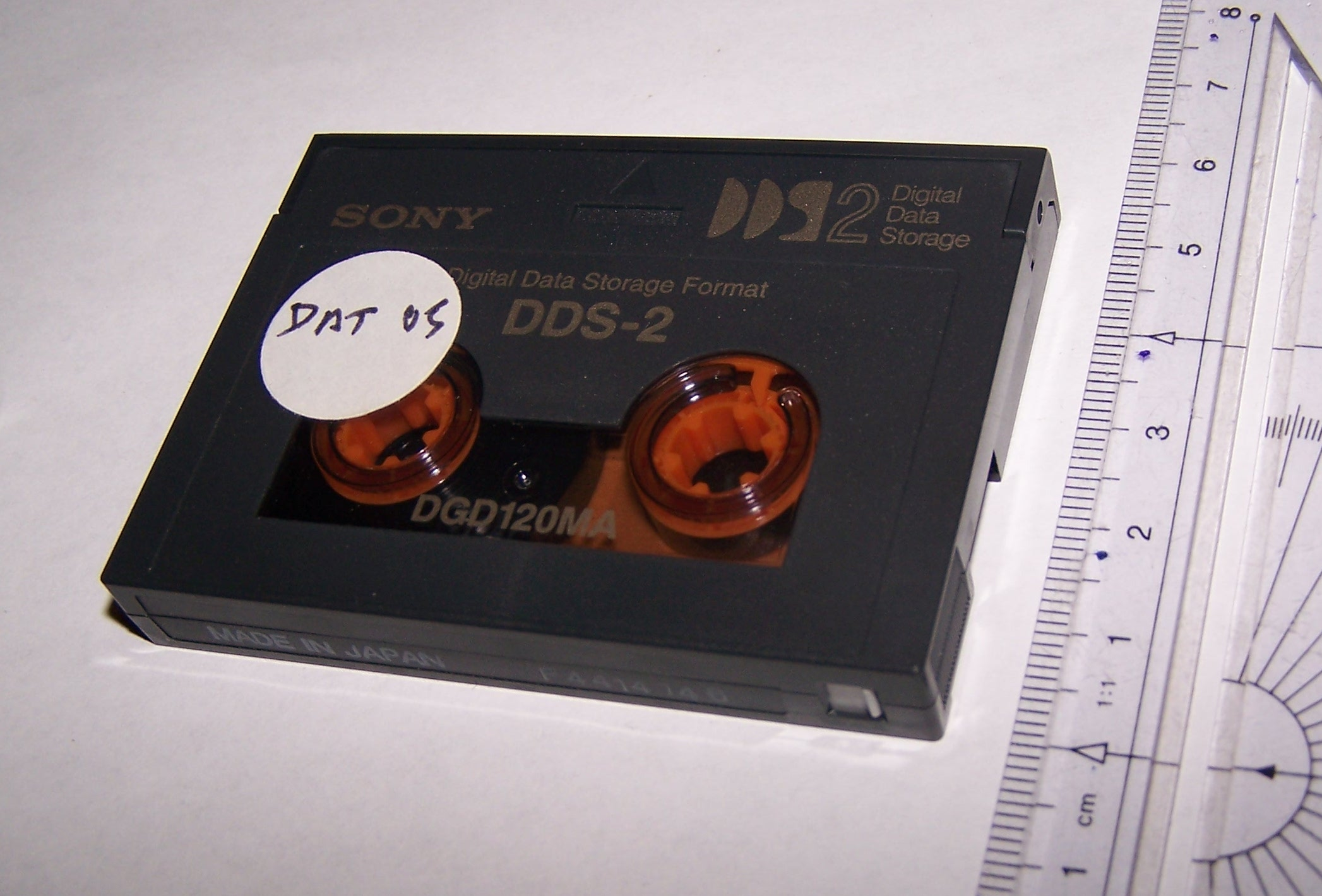
A DDS-2 cartridge.

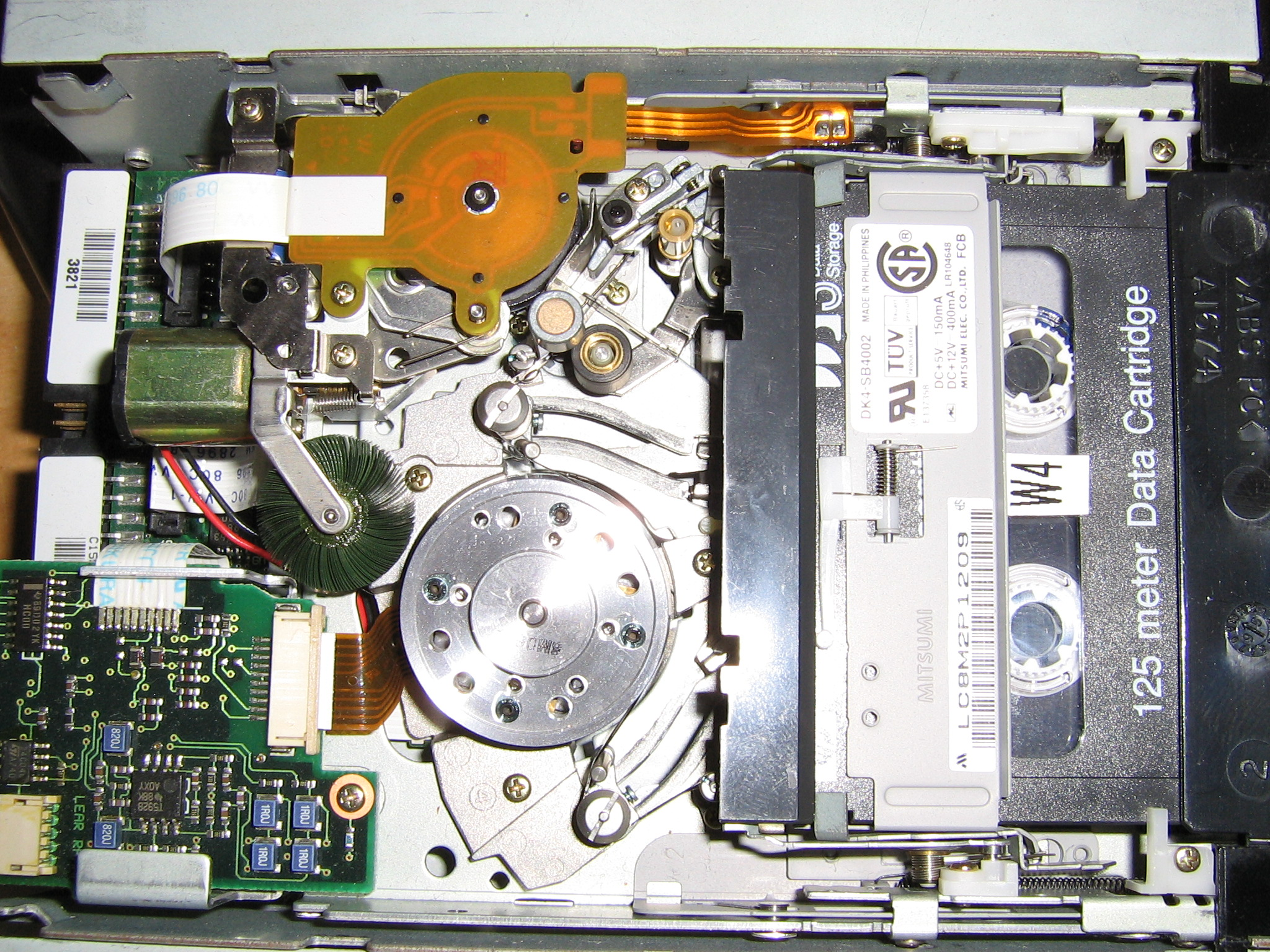
DDS Streamer inside

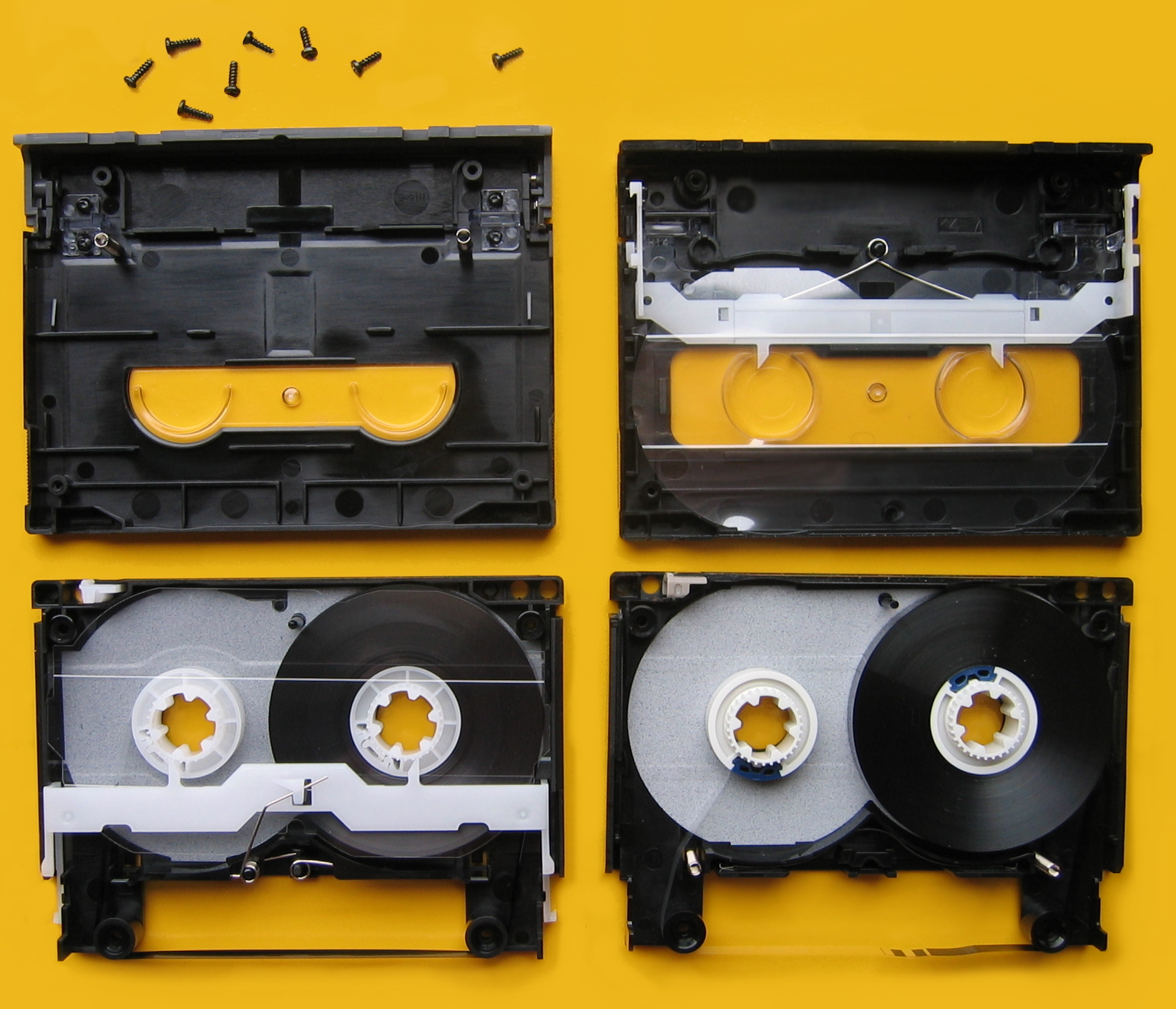
DDS Cartridges

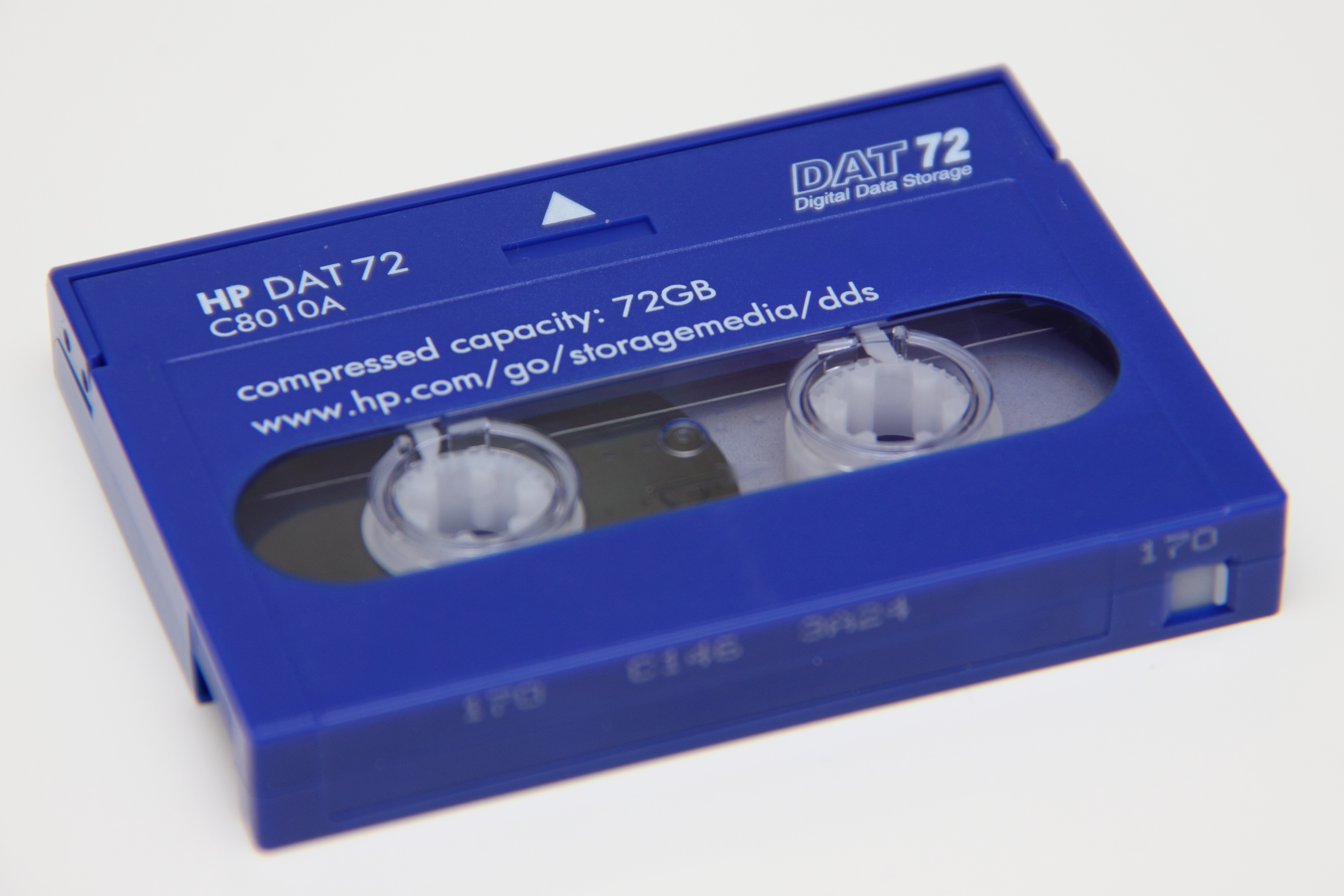
A DAT 72 cartridge

DAT 160 logo

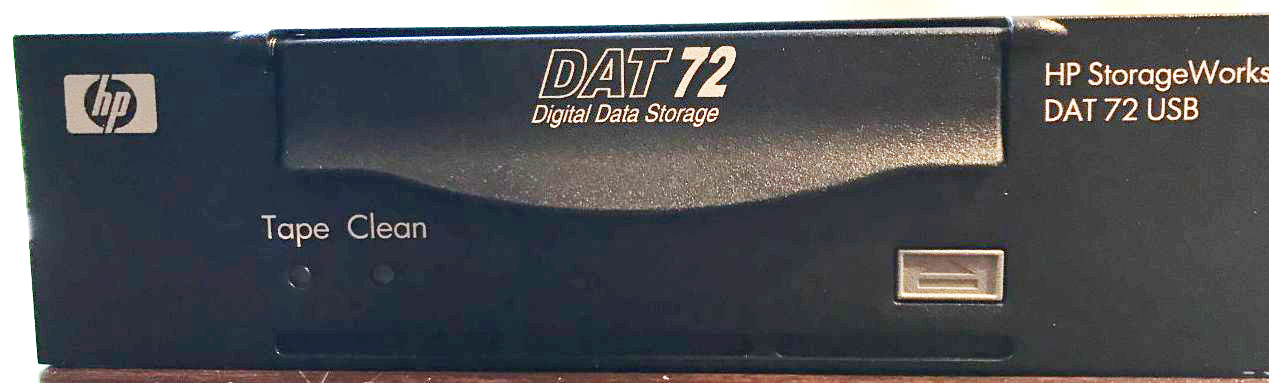
DAT-72 tape drive, front panel

DDS-1
Stores up to 1.3 GB uncompressed (2.6 GB compressed) on a 60 m cartridge or 2 GB uncompressed (4 GB compressed) on a 90 m cartridge. The DDS-1 cartridge often does not have the -1 designation, as initially it was the only format, though cartridges produced since the introduction of DDS-2 may carry a -1 designation to distinguish the format from newer formats. A media recognition system was introduced with DDS-2 drives and cartridges to detect the medium type and prevent the loading of an improper medium. From 1993, DDS-1 tapes included the media recognition system marks on the leader tape—a feature indicated by the presence of four vertical bars after the DDS logo.
The DDS-1 cartridges in 60 m and 90 m lengths, often referred as DDS-60 or DDS-90 can be used in Digital Audio Tape recorders. They have a playing time of 120 minutes or 180 minutes.
DDS-2
Stores up to 4 GB uncompressed (8 GB compressed) on a 120 m cartridge.
DDS-3
Stores up to 12 GB uncompressed (24 GB compressed) on a 125 m cartridge. DDS-3 uses PRML (Partial Response Maximum Likelihood) to minimize electronic noise for a cleaner data recording.
DDS-4
DDS-4 stores up to 20 GB uncompressed (40 GB compressed) on a 150 m cartridge. This format is also called DAT 40.
DAT 72
DAT 72 stores up to 36 GB uncompressed (72 GB compressed) on a 170 m cartridge. The DAT 72 standard was developed by HP and Certance. It has the same form-factor as DDS-3 and -4 and is sometimes referred to as DDS-5.
DAT 160
DAT 160 was launched in June 2007 by HP, stores up to 80 GB uncompressed (160 GB compressed). A major change from the previous generations is the width of the tape. DAT 160 uses 8 mm wide tape in a slightly thicker cartridge while all prior versions use 3.81 mm wide tape. Despite the difference in tape widths, DAT 160 drives can load DAT-72 and DAT-40 (DDS-4) cartridges. Native capacity is 80 GB and native transfer rate was raised to 6.9 MB/s, mostly due to prolonging head/tape contact to 180° (compared to 90° previously). Launch interfaces were Parallel SCSI and USB, with SAS interface released later.
DAT 320
In November 2009 HP announced the DAT-320 standard, which stores up to 160 GB uncompressed (marketed as 320 GB assuming 2:1 compression) per cartridge. Native transfer rate was raised to 12 MB/s.

=== Generations ===
DDS generations
Format	Date	Tape width (mm)	Track pitch (μm)	Tape length (m)	Native capacity (GB)	Capacity assuming 2:1 compression (GB)	Drum rotation speed (RPM)	Data transfer speed (MB/s)
DDS-1	1989	3.81	13.6	60/90	1.3/2.0	2.6/4	2000, 2551	0.183
DDS-2	1993	3.81	9.1	120	4.0	8	4000, 4400, 5737, 8500	0.360-0.720
DDS-3	1996	3.81	9.1	125	12.0	24	3825, 4252	<1.5
DDS-4	1999	3.81	6.8	150	20.0	40	11400	1.0-3.2
DAT-72	2003	3.81	5.4	170	36.0	72	8609.7, 10000	3.2
DAT-160	2007	8	6.8	154	80	160	6457	6.9
DAT-320	2009	8		153	160	320		12
(Gen 8)	canceled	8			~300	~600		≥16

=== Future ===
The next format, Gen 8, was canceled.

== See also ==
- WangDAT
- Data8
- Magnetic storage
