= VXA =

Tape backup format

VXA is a tape backup format originally created by Ecrix and now owned by Tandberg Data. After the merger between Ecrix and Exabyte on 17 November 2001, VXA was produced by Exabyte Corporation. On November 20, 2006, Exabyte was purchased by Tandberg Data that has since stopped further development of the format.

== Operation ==
Exabyte and Ecrix describe the data format as "packet technology." Since VXA is based on helical scan technology, data is written across the tape from side to side in helical strips.

The novel part of VXA packet technology is that each stripe starts with a unique packet ID and ends with an ECC packet checksum. As each stripe is written to tape, it is immediately read back to verify that the write was successful.

If the write was not 100% successful the packet can be rewritten at another point on the tape without stopping. When the data is read back, the packets are reassembled into a "buffer" by their packet ID. The buffer has 3 additional ECCs to ensure data integrity.

Another aspect of VXA is that there are 2 read heads for each stripe, slightly offset in relation to each other to allow for more flexibility in reading tapes written by other drives.

Due to the relatively slow tape speed inherent to helical scan technology, the drive is able to stop and start the tape much more quickly to avoid the need to backhitch.

== Market context ==
The VXA format competes mainly against the DDS, and DLT-IV formats.

== Overview ==
Generation	VXA-1	VXA-2	VXA-3	VXA-4	VXA-5
Release date	1999	2002	2005	Unreleased	Unreleased
Max native (uncompressed) capacity (GB)	33	80	160	320	640
Max speed (MB/s)	3	6	12	24	48
Encoding	EFM	PRML			
Track width	9.1 μm		5.7 μm		
Head		Ferrite	TFMR		

=== VXA-3 ===
Exabyte released two different product lines based on VXA-3 technology, VXA-320 in 2005 and VXA-172 in 2006. VXA-172 drives are limited to 86 GB per tape cartridge, but can be unlocked (for a fee) to remove the limit. They are otherwise the same. VXA-3 was the first helical scan system in production to feature thin film MR heads.

=== Notes ===
- Data Capacity figures above are for uncompressed data. Exabyte assumes a 2x compression factor in their marketing material.

=== Media ===
Media was released on two families (V and X), with different capacities based on the length of the tape, and the drive it is being used in.

Product	V6	V10	V17	V23	X6	X10	X23
Length (Meters)	62m	107m	170m	230m	62m	124m	230m
Native Capacity	(when used in the given type of drive - empty means not compatible)						
VXA-1	12 GB	20 GB	33 GB				
VXA-2	20 GB	40 GB	60 GB	80 GB	20 GB	40 GB	80 GB
VXA-172					40 GB	86 GB	
VXA-320				160 GB	40 GB	86 GB	160 GB

== Gallery ==
=== Cartridge / tape ===
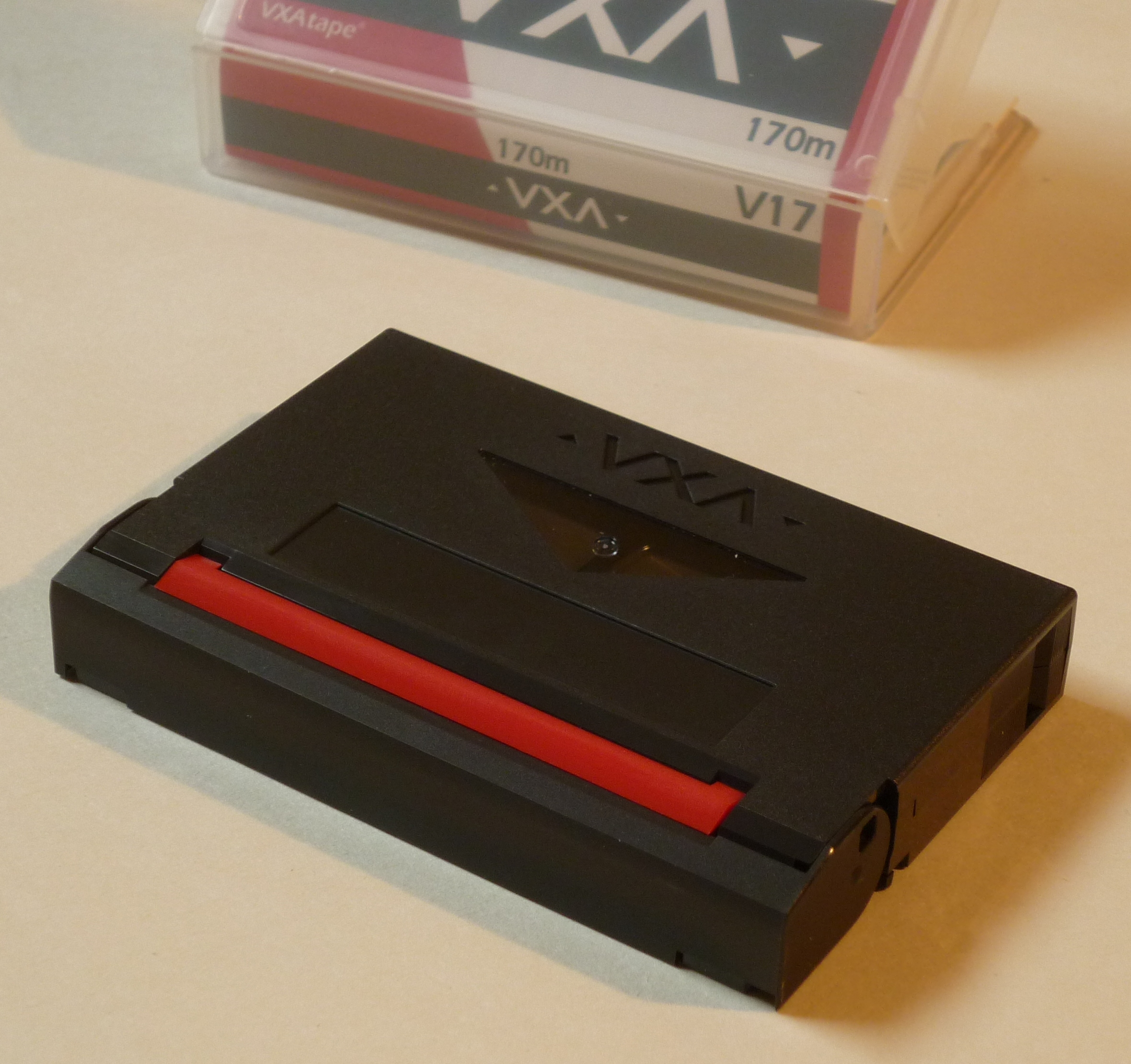
VXA tape V17 (170m), top view

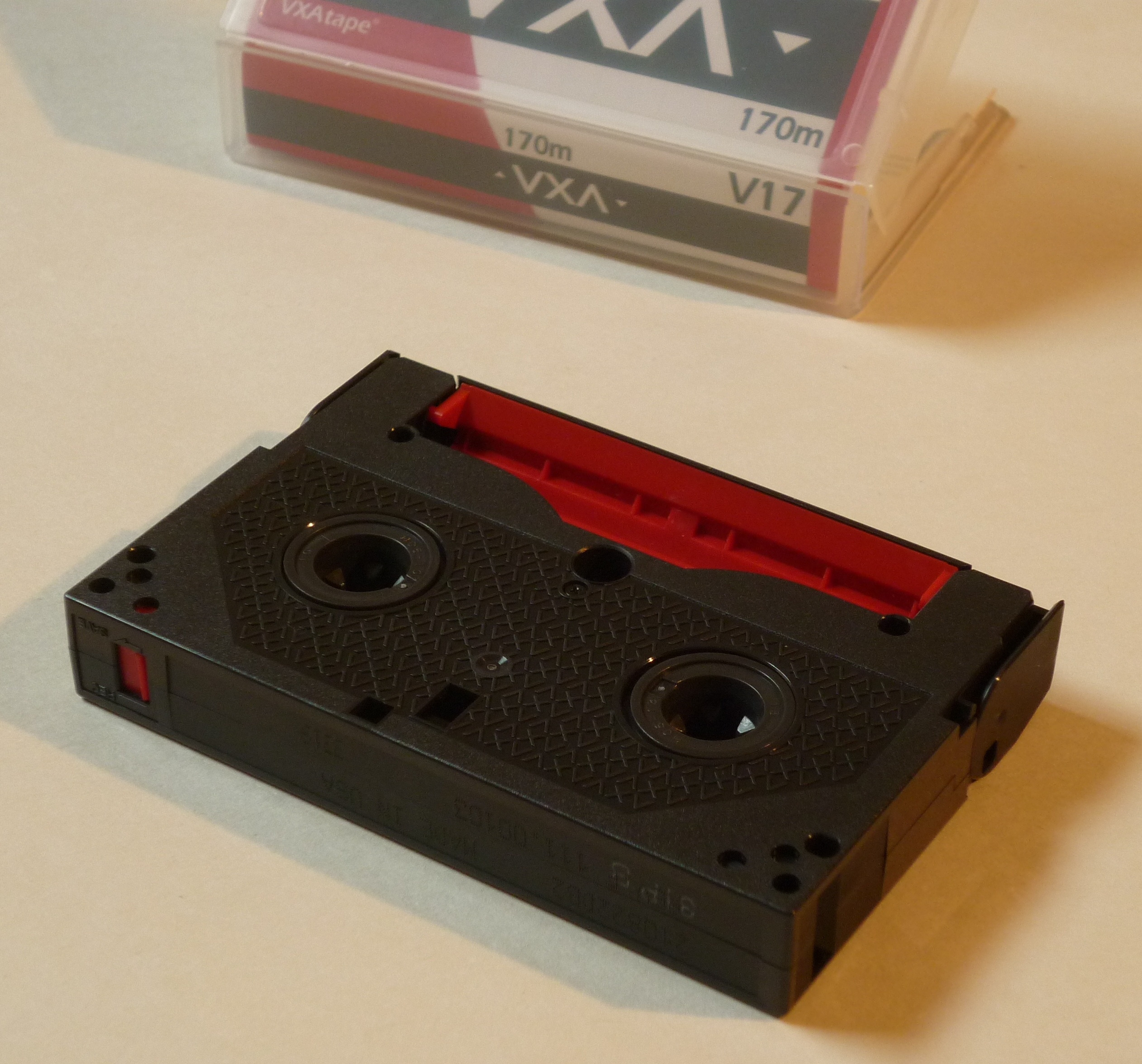
VXA tape V17 (170m), bottom view

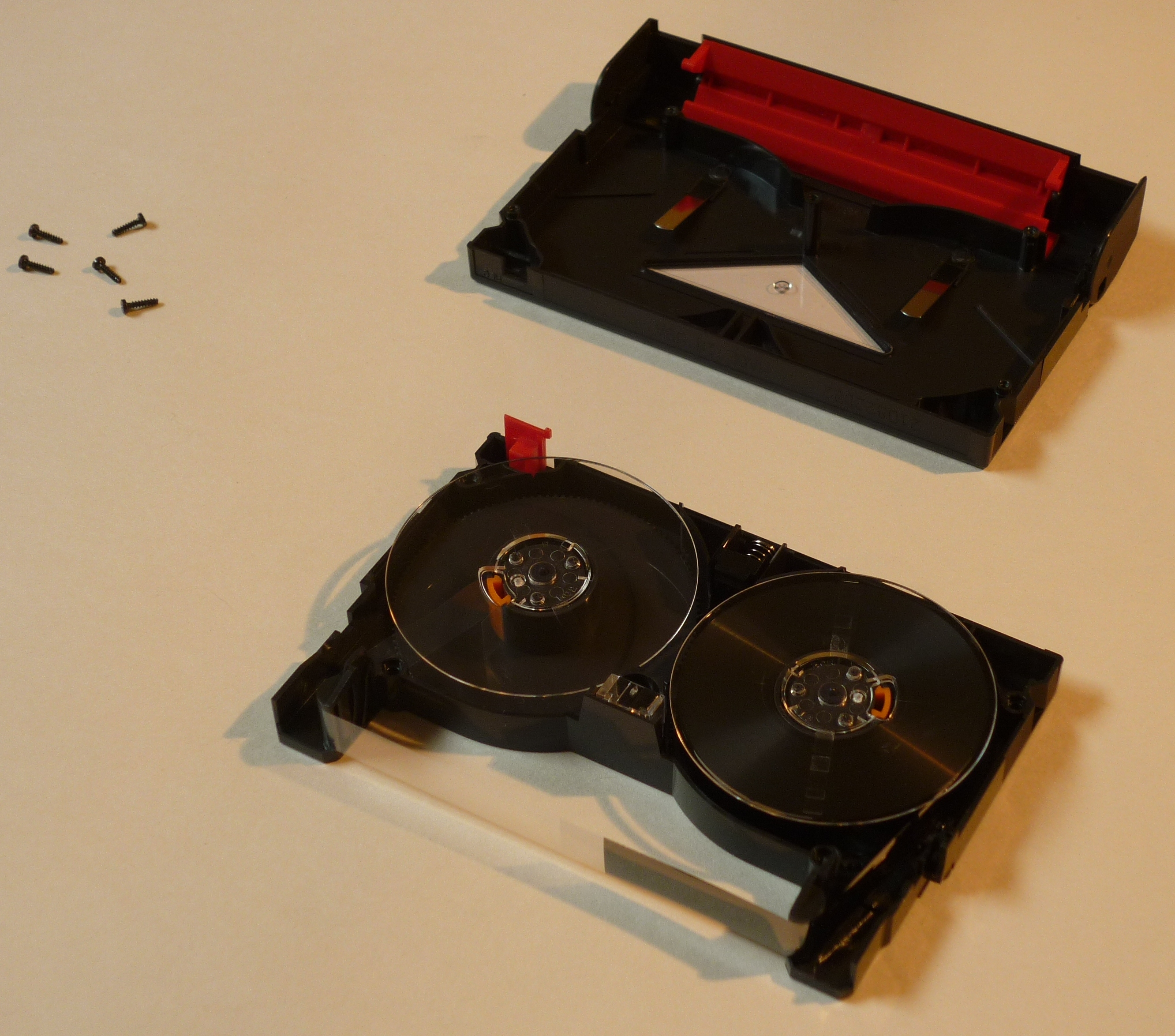
VXA tape V17 (170m), partially disassembled

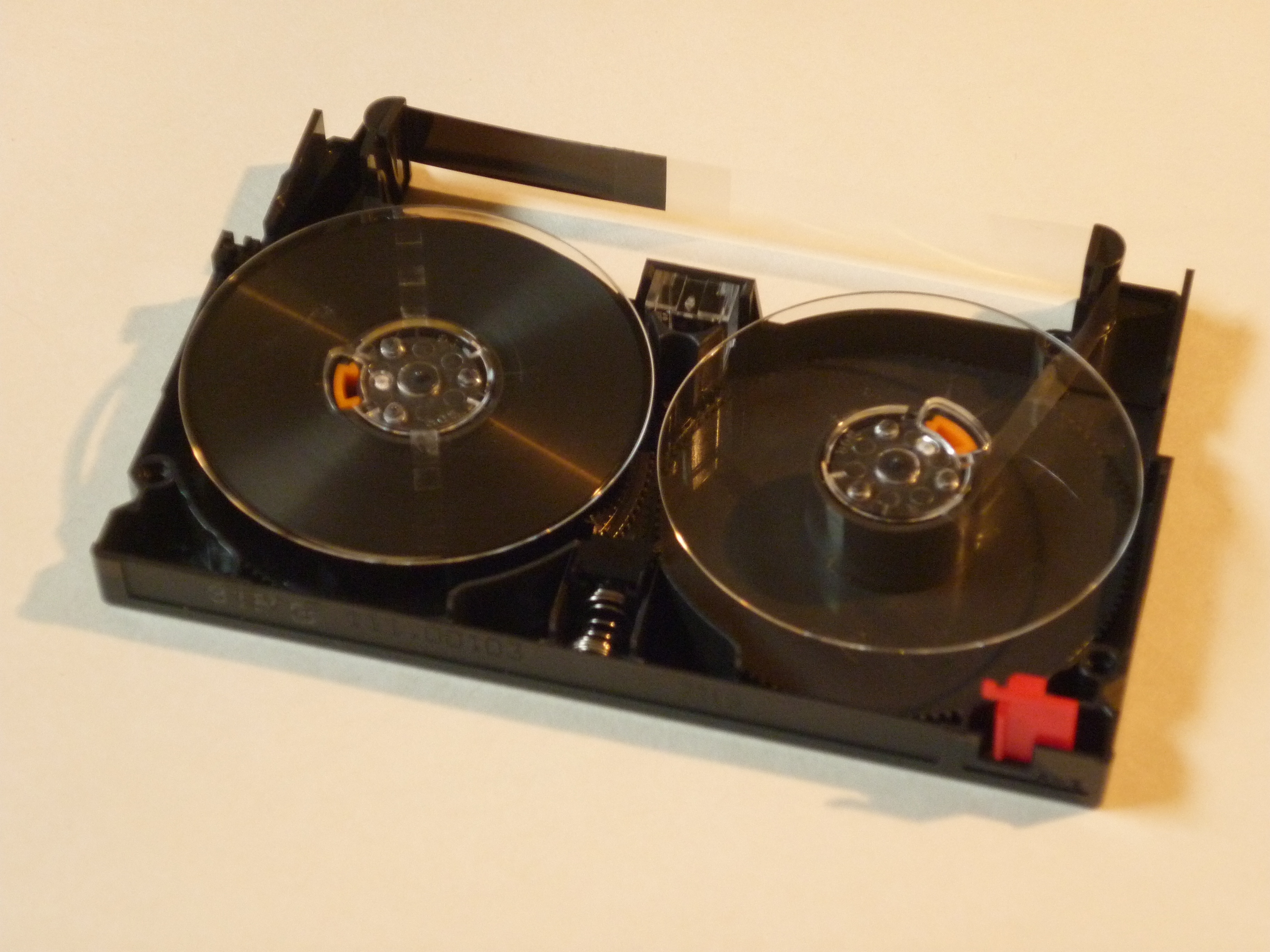
VXA tape V17 (170m x 8mm) magnetic tape, no cover

=== Mechanism / drive ===
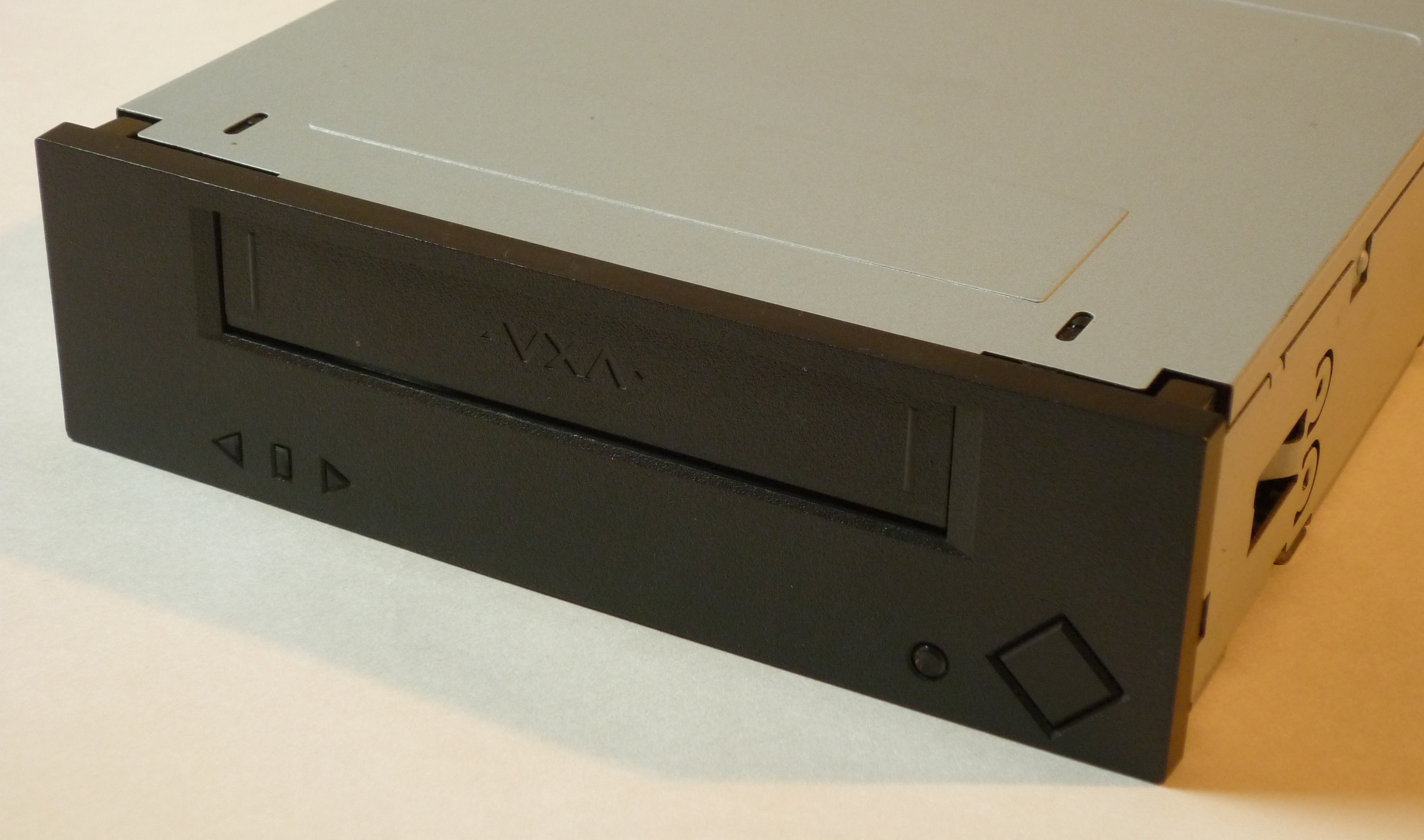
VXA-1 tape drive, front bezel view

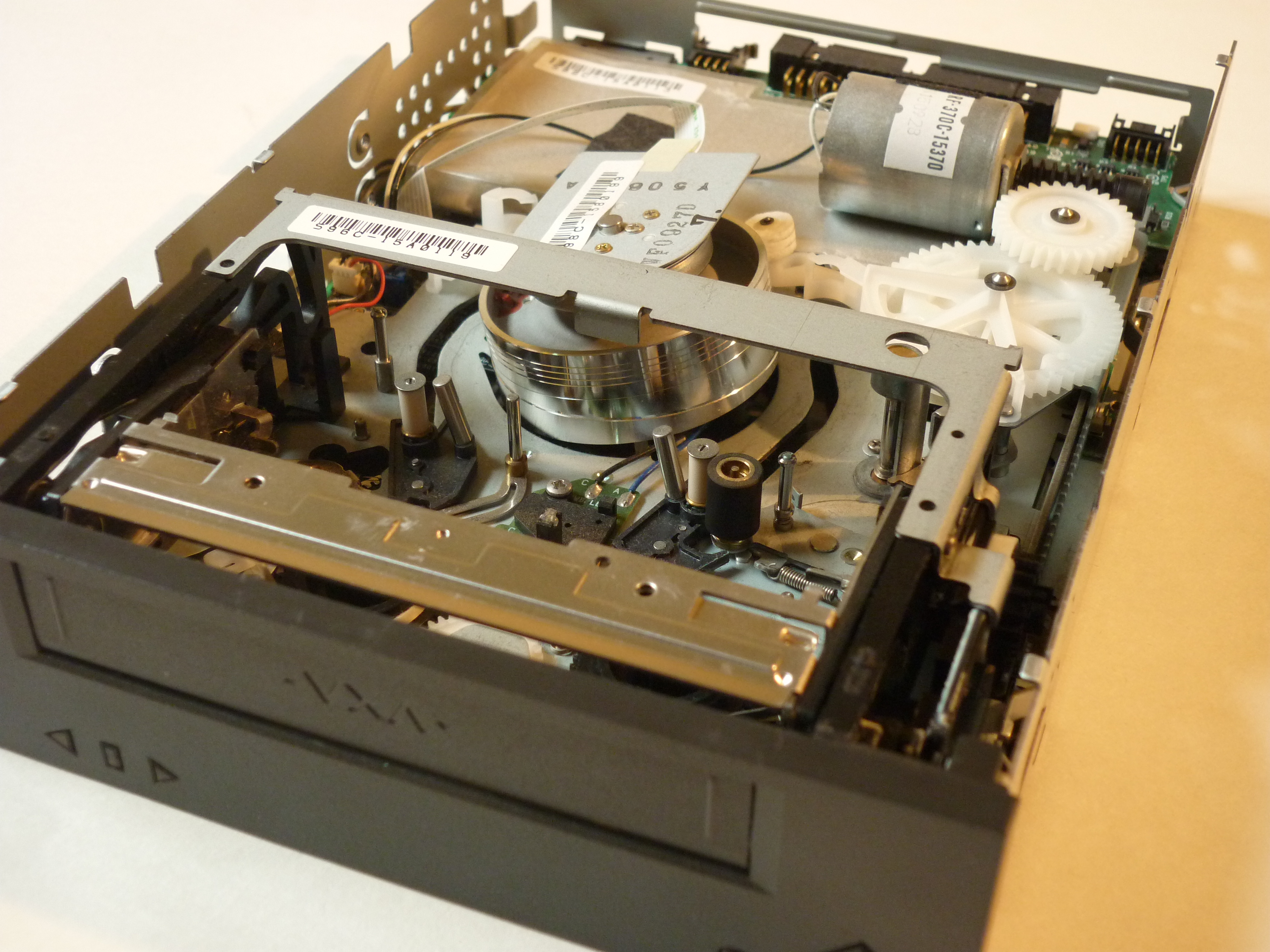
VXA-1 tape, drive, cover removed, top front view

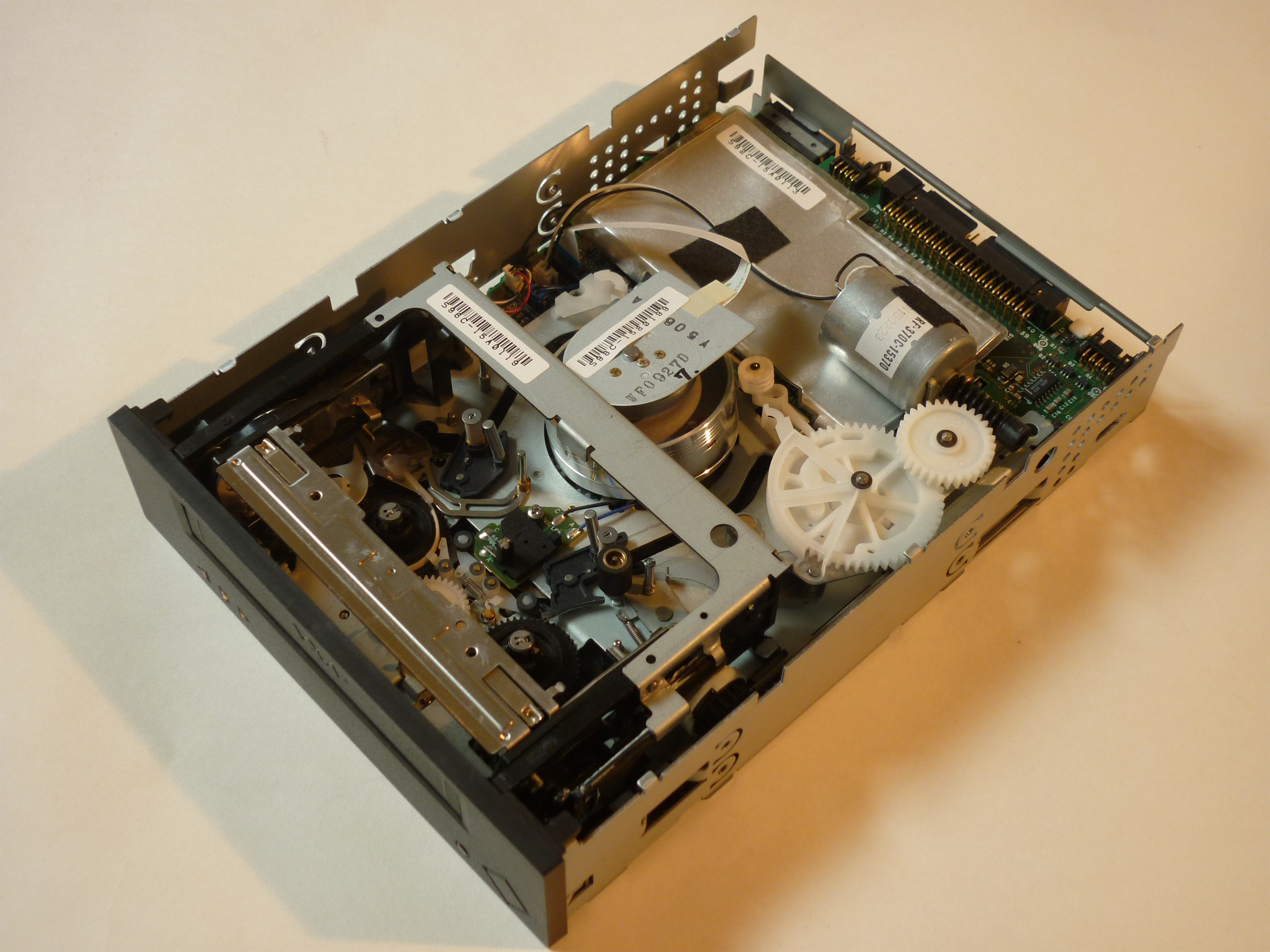
VXA-1 tape drive, cover removed, top view

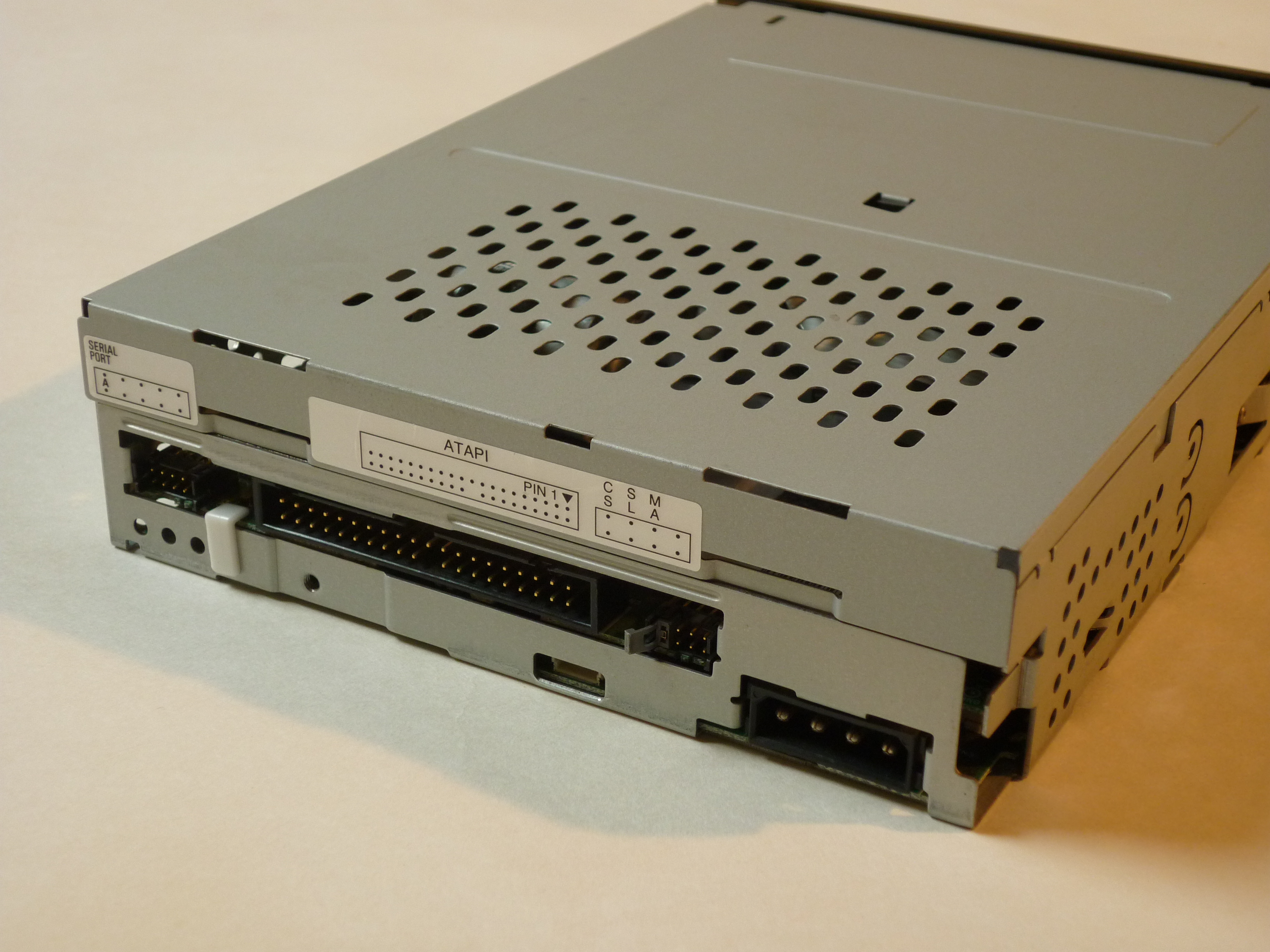
VXA-1 tape drive, rear view, showing ATAPI interface

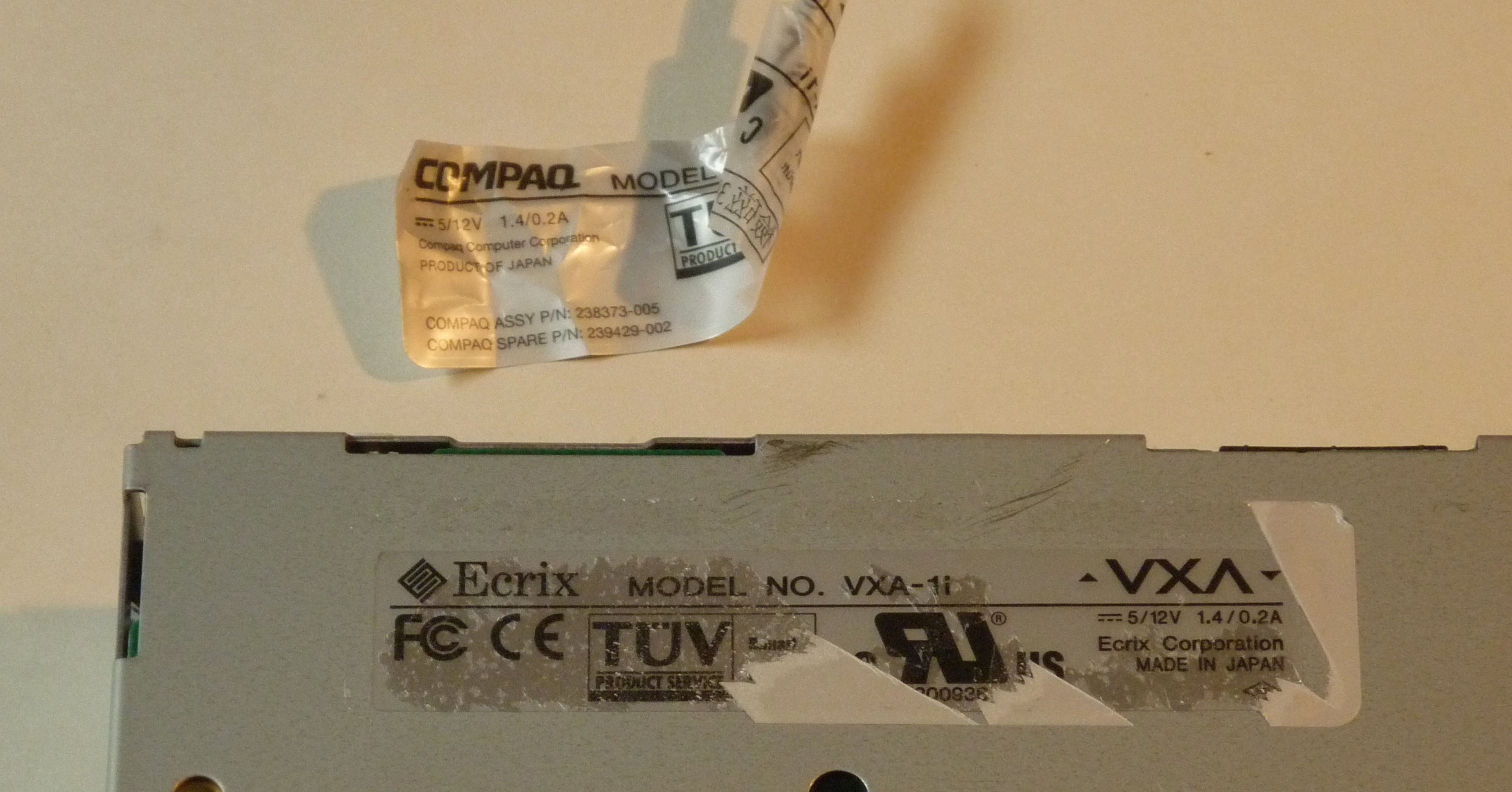
bottom rear, showing original and rebrand labels

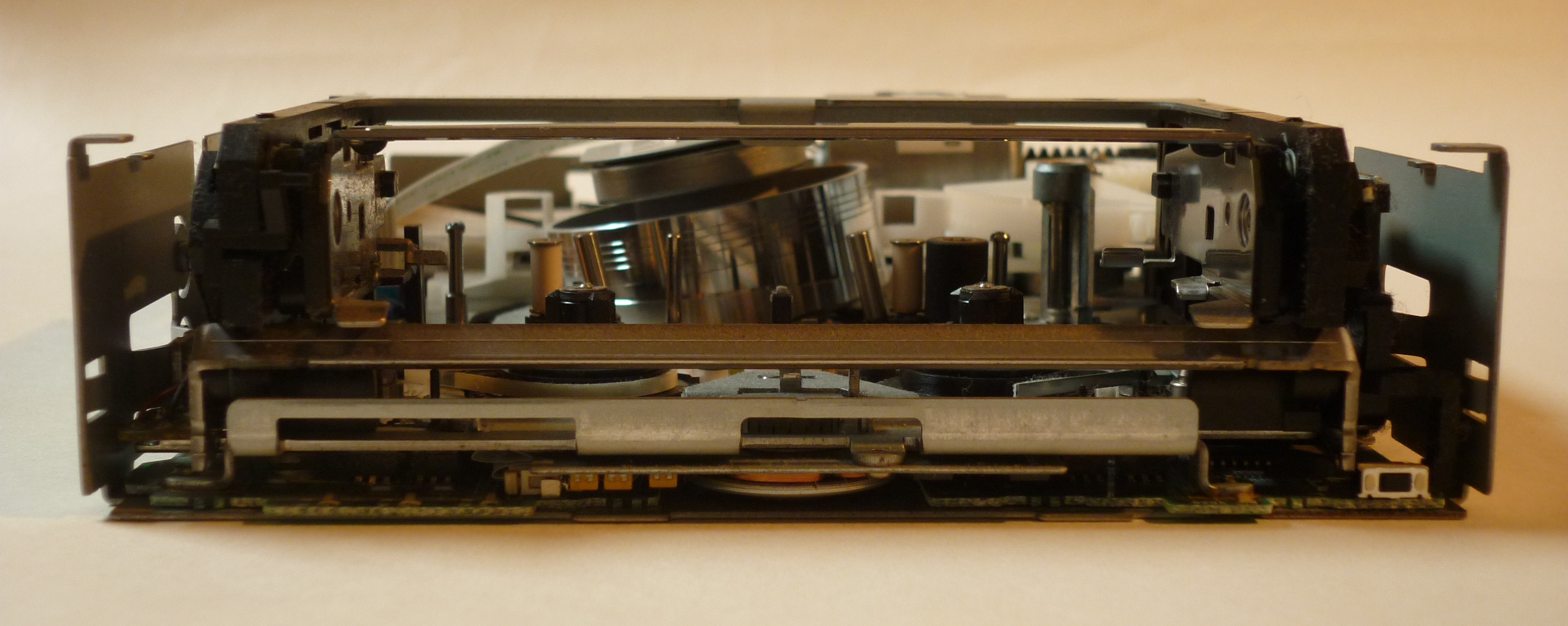
front view, cover and bezel removed, rotary head visible

=== Tape and drive together ===
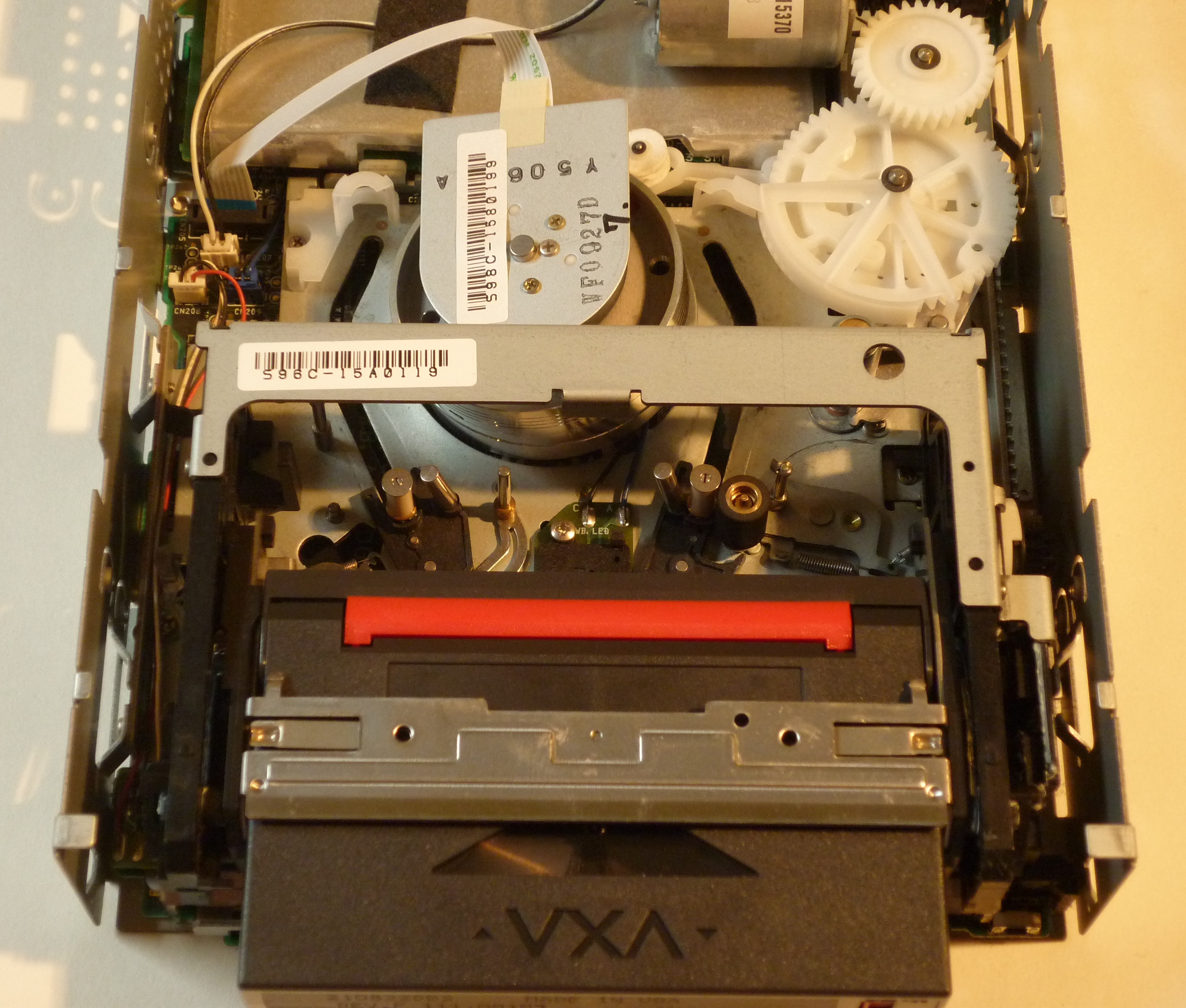
VXA-1 tape drive with tape inserted

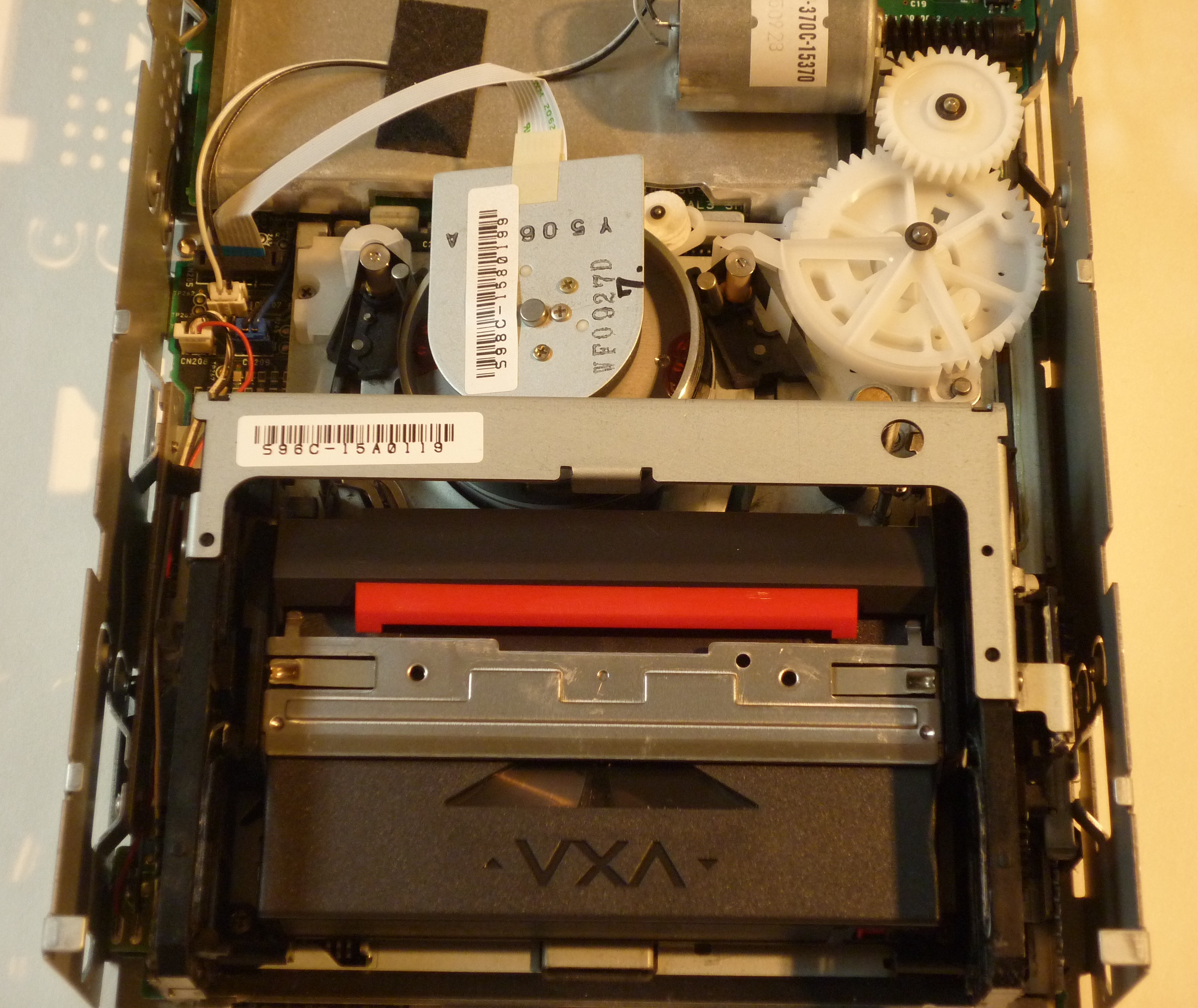
VXA-1 tape drive with tape loaded and threaded

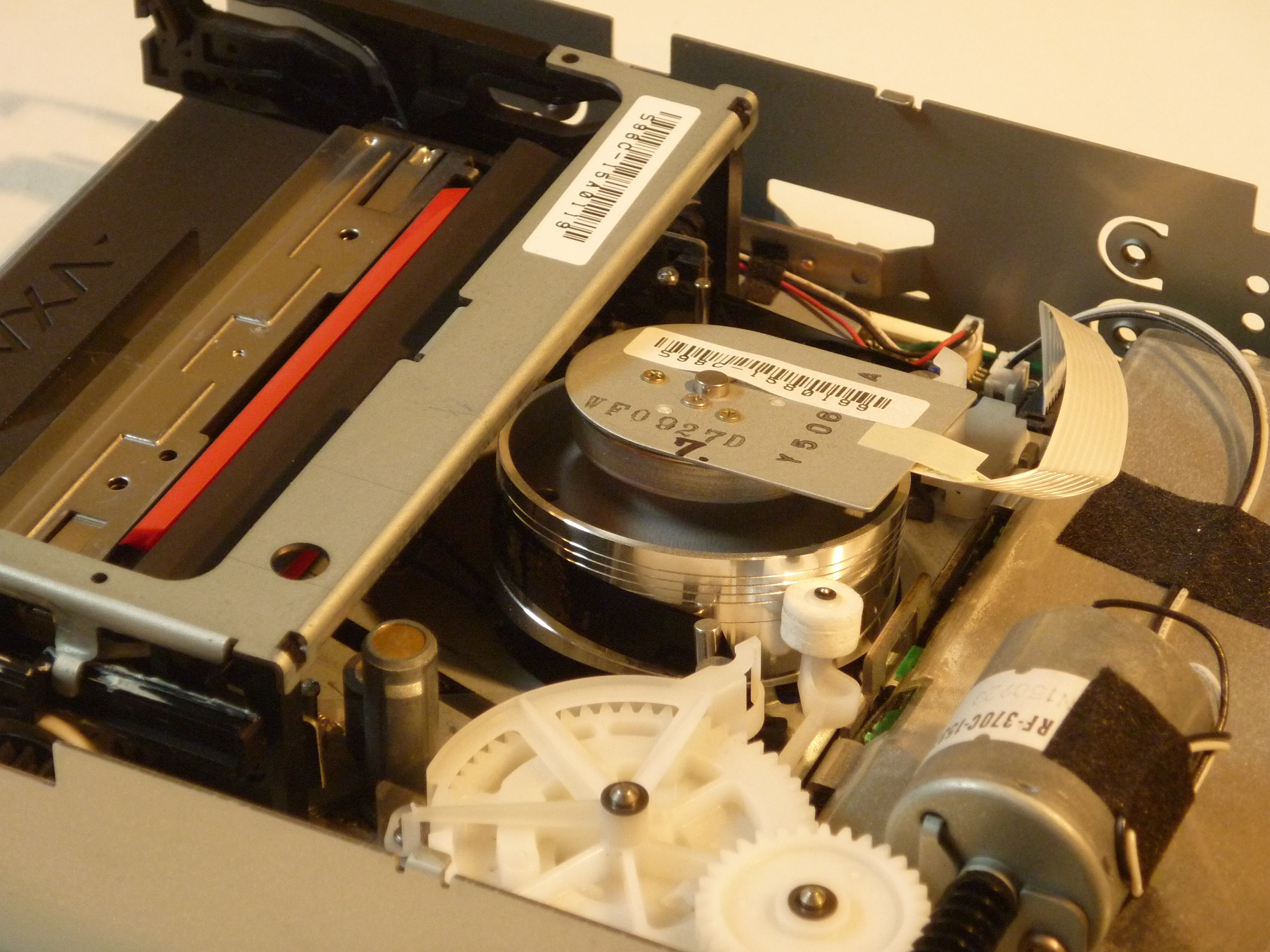
VXA-1 tape drive with tape loaded, view from right side

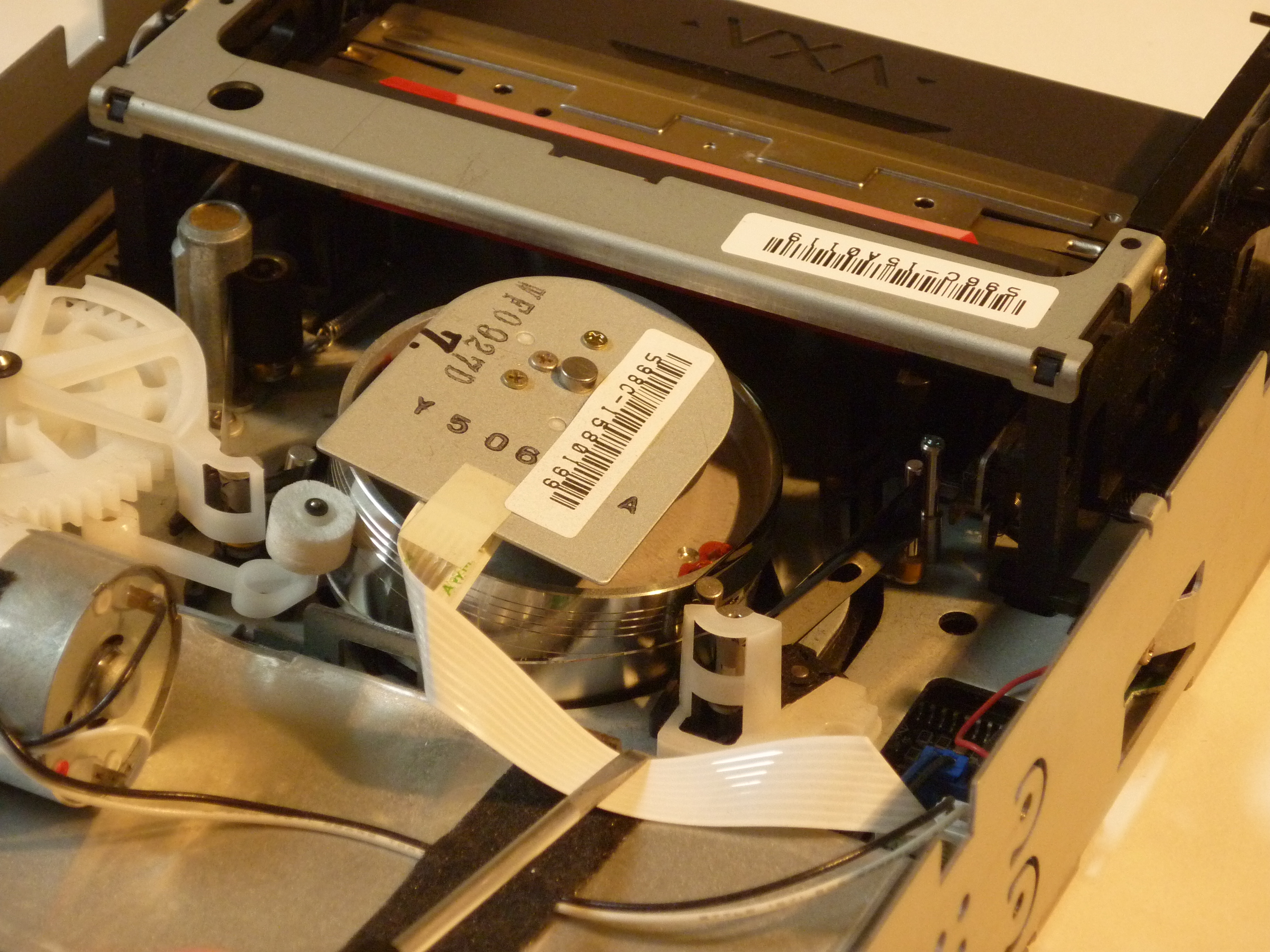
VXA-1 tape drive with tape loaded, view from rear left
