= IBM 7070 =

Decimal computer introduced by IBM in 1958

- Released: 1958; 68 years ago
- Memory: 5,000 or 9,990 words
- Predecessor: IBM 650; IBM 705
- Successor: IBM System/360

IBM 7074

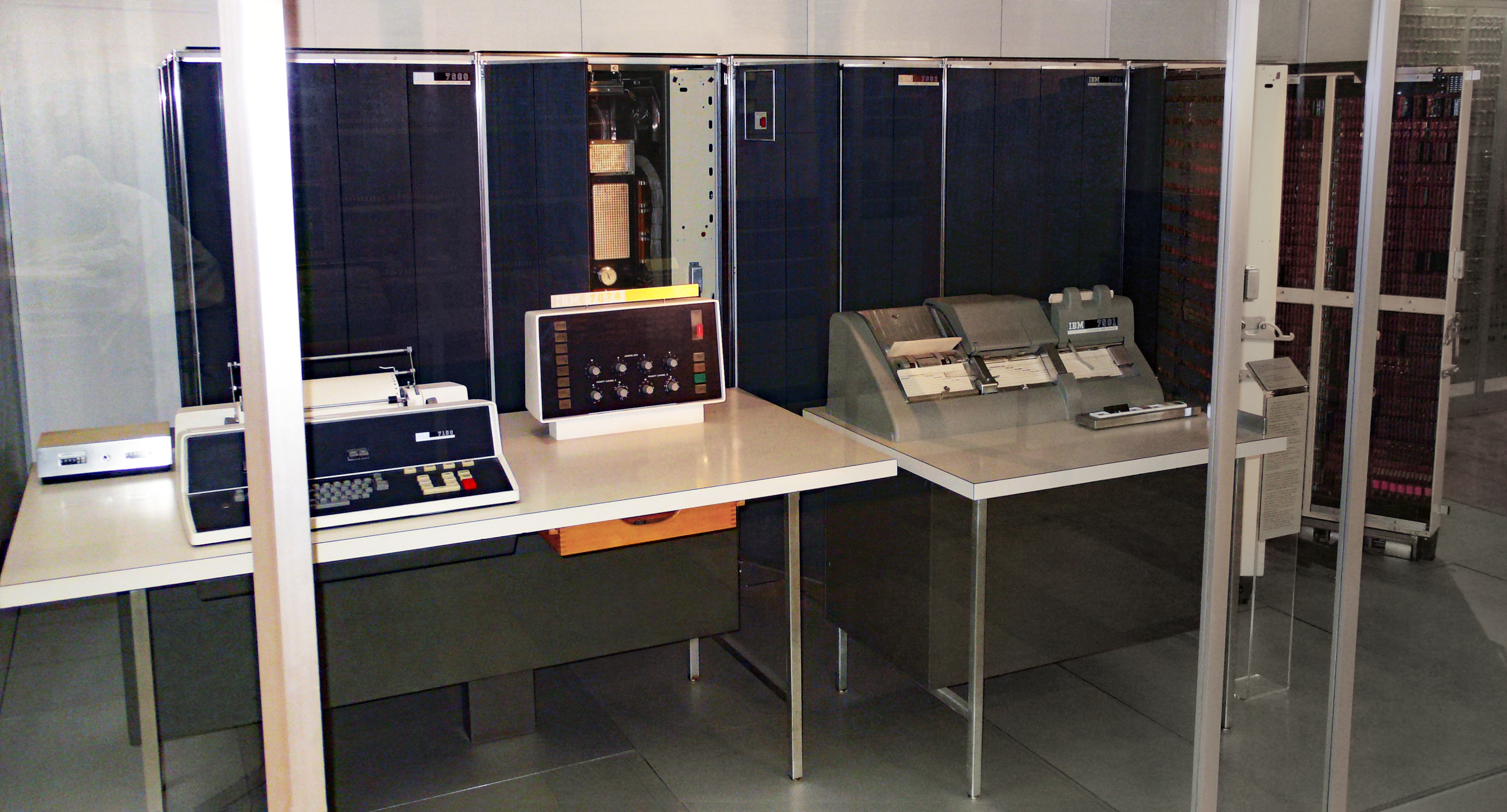
- IBM 7074
- Released: 1960; 66 years ago
- Memory: 5,000 to 30,000 words
- Predecessor: IBM 7070
- Successor: IBM System/360

IBM 7072
- Released: 1961; 65 years ago
- Successor: IBM System/360

The IBM 7070 was a transistorized, decimal-architecture data-processing system introduced by IBM in 1958. Part of the IBM 700/7000 series, it was designed for commercial and administrative workloads and used discrete transistors and IBM Standard Modular System circuit boards rather than vacuum tubes.

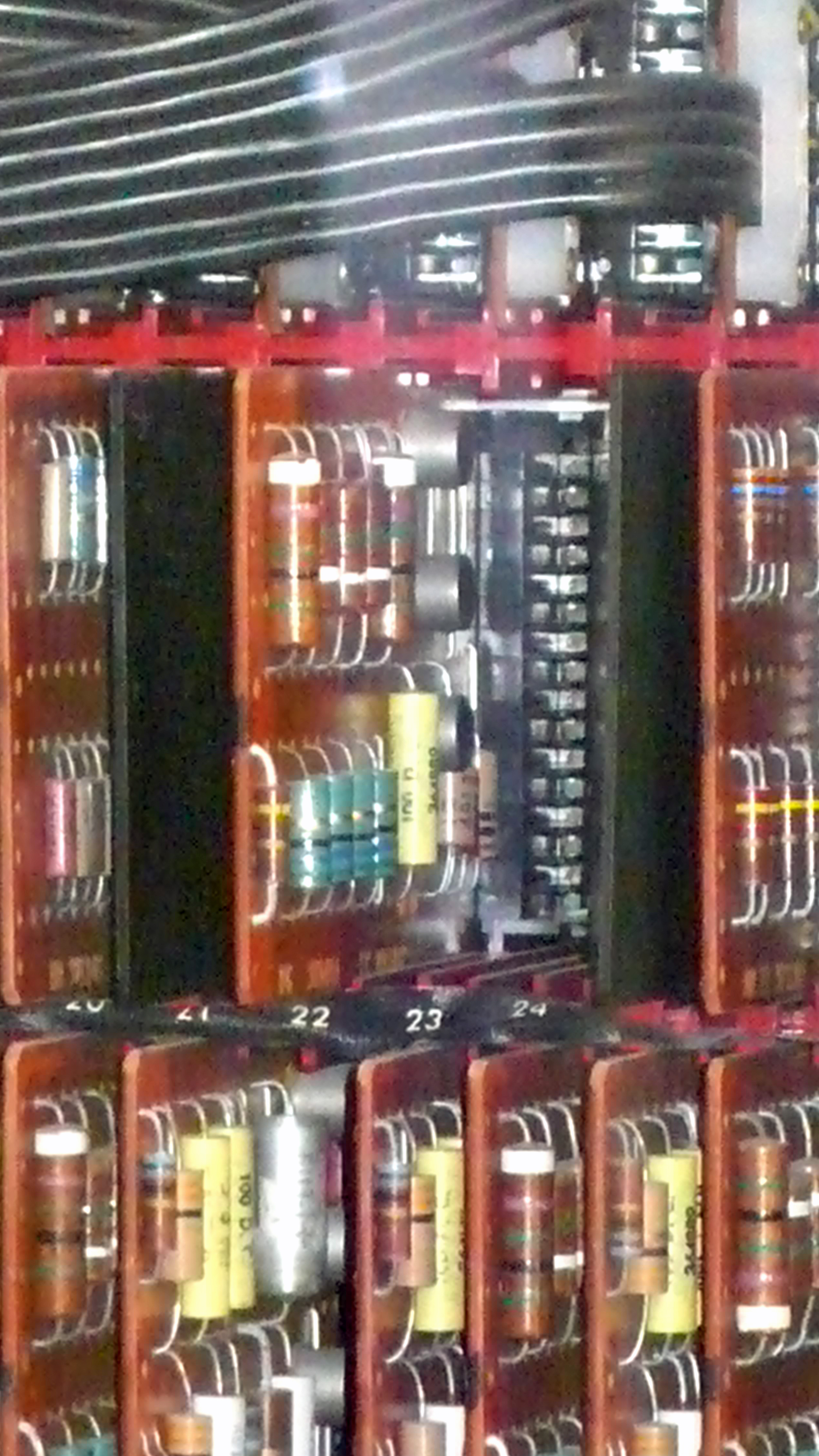
IBM 7070 transistor circuit SMS boards

IBM intended the 7070 as a successor to both the drum-memory IBM 650 and the business-oriented IBM 705. It was not instruction-compatible with the 650, whose instructions included an extra address intended to optimize access to rotating drum storage; existing programs therefore required a simulator. Later members of the family were the faster IBM 7074 and the lower-cost IBM 7072. The line was superseded by IBM System/360.

The system used magnetic-core memory with either 5,000 or 9,990 ten-digit words. A typical installation could combine card, printer, magnetic-tape and disk equipment through data-channel and synchronizer units.

== Architecture ==
The 7070 is word-addressable. Each word contains ten decimal digits and a sign, whose value can be plus, minus or alpha. With an alpha sign, the word represents five characters, each encoded by a pair of decimal digits. Individual digits use a two-out-of-five code.

The machine has a single address space for core memory and its addressable registers, including three accumulators and 99 index words. A typical instruction occupies one word and contains a signed two-digit operation code, a two-digit index field, a two-digit control field and a four-digit address. Many instructions use the control field to select a range of digits within a word, allowing fields to be processed without first moving them to separate storage.

For block transfers, input/output and table lookup, the 7070 uses lists of record definition words (RDWs). Each RDW specifies the starting and ending addresses of a block; a minus sign marks the final RDW in a list.

== Hardware implementation ==
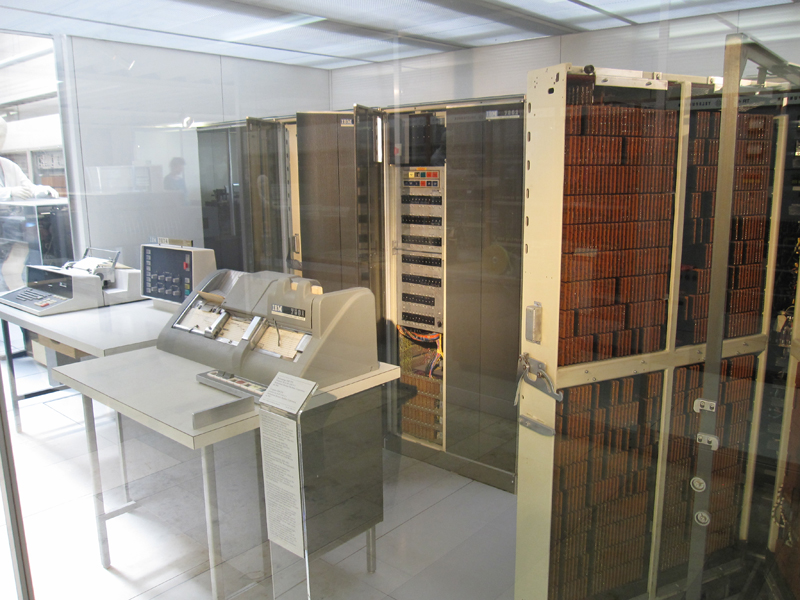
IBM 7074

The 7070 was implemented using both CTDL (in the logic and control sections) and current-mode logic (in the timing storage and core storage sections) on Standard Modular System (SMS) cards. A total of about 30,000 alloy-junction germanium transistors and 22,000 germanium diodes are used, on approximately 14,000 SMS cards.

== Input/Output in original announcement ==
The 7070, 7072 and 7074 support a variety of peripheral devices. including up to one 7150 console typewriter, four 7300 Disk-Storage units attached to an IBM 7604 Tape Control via an IBM 7605 RAMAC Control, 40 729 models II and IV (Note: The 7072 uses the slower 7330 tape drives in place of the 729 drives used by the 7070 and 7074.) tape drives attached to an IBM 7604 Tape Control, and six unit-record devices (three input and three output) attached to an IBM 7603 Input/Output Synchronizer via an IBM 7600 Input/Output control.

=== Mode of operation ===
Every I/O operation uses a list of Record Definition Words (RDWs); the last RDW in the list has a minus sign. Each RDW has a beginning and ending address.

Ten (Note: Expansion beyond 6 729 drives requires the additional tape attachment optional feature on the 7604.) 729 tape drives can be attached to each of four I/O channels. Four 7300 disk drives can be attached to the first two channels. The channels run asynchronously to the processor and generate priority interrupts upon completion of an operation.

Unit-record devices (Card readers, printers, punches) are connected to a 7600 Input/Output control via a 7603 synchronizer that buffers cards and print lines. Completion of a transfer between the device and the buffer generates a priority interrupt. Transfers between the buffer and core storage delay the processor until completion. Transfers are limited to 16 words.

The 7150 console and 7501 console card reader are connected directly to the 7600 Input/Output control

=== 729 Tape drives ===
The IBM 729 is a seven-track tape drive common to most of the IBM 14xx and 70xx computers. It is available as a model II and a faster model IV. The models II and IV normally record at 556 BPI, but they support 200 BPI for compatibility with the older IBM 727 and 729 model I. The models V and VI, supporting 800 BPI, were announced later. The 729 is not used on the 7072.

=== 7150 Console control unit ===
The 7150 includes a console typewriter that both controls the system and communicates with the running program via the 7600 I/O control.

==== 7151 console card reader ====
The 7151 console card reader is a modified keypunch that can only read.

=== 7300 Disk Storage Units ===
The IBM 7300 Disk Storage Unit has a capacity of 6 million digits. The IBM 1301 replaced it in 1961.

=== 7330 Tape drive ===
The IBM 7330 is a slower, less expensive, alternative to the 729; it is not used on the 7070 or 7074. Like the 729 II and IV, the 7330 supports dual (200 BPI/556 BPI) density.

=== 7400 Printer ===
Up to three 7400 Printers can be attached to the 7603 Input/Output Synchronizer. The 7400 prints 120 column lines at up to 150 lines per minute. The installation must wire a plugboard to control the layout of the print line.

=== 7500 Card reader ===
Up to three 7500 Card readers can be attached to the 7603 Input/Output Synchronizer. The 7500 reads 80-column cards at up to 500 cards per minute. The installation must wire a plugboard to control the layout of the cards.

=== 7550 Card punch ===
Up to three 7550 Card punches can be attached to the 7603 Input/Output Synchronizer. The 7550 punches 80-column cards at up to 250 cards per minute. The installation must wire a plugboard to control the layout of the cards.

== Additional or optional I/O units ==
=== 7907 Data Channel ===
The 7907 is an 8-bit channel with the same interface as the 7908 and 7909 channels on the 7080 and 7090.

=== 1301 and 1302 Disk storage ===
In 1961, IBM announced the IBM 1301-1 Disk Storage Unit, with a capacity of 28 million characters per module, replacing the IBM 7300 Disk Storage Units. The 1301 attaches to an IBM 7907 Data Channel via an IBM 7631-II File Control.

In 1963, IBM announced the IBM 1302, with quadruple the capacity of the 1301.

=== 7340 Hypertape ===
In 1961, IBM announced the IBM 7340 Hypertape. The 7340 attaches to an IBM 7907 Data Channel via an IBM 7640 Hypertape Control.

=== 1414 I/O Synchronizer ===
- IBM 1414-6 Input-Output Synchronizer contains six buffers and can attach a variety of serial I/O devices:
  - 1009 Data Transmission Unit (modem)
  - 1011 Paper Tape Reader
  - 1014 Remote Enquiry Units (keyboards and typewriter)
  - Telegraph I/O units

The 1414-6 is connected to 7070/7074 via the IBM 7907 Data Channel Switch. The 7907 can execute channel programs from the main memory of the 7070.

== See also ==
- IBM 608, IBMs first all-transistor product (only plugboard-programmable)
