= IBM 7080 =

Transistor computer, commercial architecture, 1961

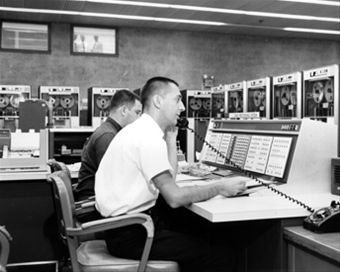
IBM 7080

The IBM 7080 was a variable word length BCD transistor computer in the IBM 700/7000 series commercial architecture line, introduced in August 1961, that provided an upgrade path from the vacuum-tube IBM 705 computer.

The 7080 weighed about 19,700 pounds (9.9 short tons; 8.9 t).

After the introduction of the IBM 7070, in June 1960, as an upgrade path for both the IBM 650 and IBM 705 computers, IBM realized that it was so incompatible with the 705 that few users of that system wanted to upgrade to the 7070. That prompted the development of the 7080, which was fully compatible with all models of the 705 and added many improvements.

== IBM 705 compatibility modes ==
For backward compatibility with the IBM 705 the machine had two switches on the operator's control panel, 705 I-II and 40K memory, that selected the mode the machine started in.

- 705 I mode — 20,000 characters (705 I-II On, 40K memory Off)
  - Indirect addressing is disabled
  - Communication channels are disabled
- 705 II mode — 40,000 characters (705 I-II On, 40K memory On)
  - Indirect addressing is disabled
  - Communication channels are disabled
- 705 III mode — 40,000 characters (705 I-II Off, 40K memory On)
  - Indirect addressing is enabled
  - Communication channels are enabled
- 705 III mode — 80,000 characters (705 I-II Off, 40K memory Off)
  - Indirect addressing is enabled
  - Communication channels are enabled

Software can then command the 7080 to enter full 7080 mode from any 705 startup mode.

- 7080 mode — 160,000 characters
  - Indirect addressing is disabled
  - Communication channels are enabled

Regardless of mode, the 7080 operates at full 7080 speed.

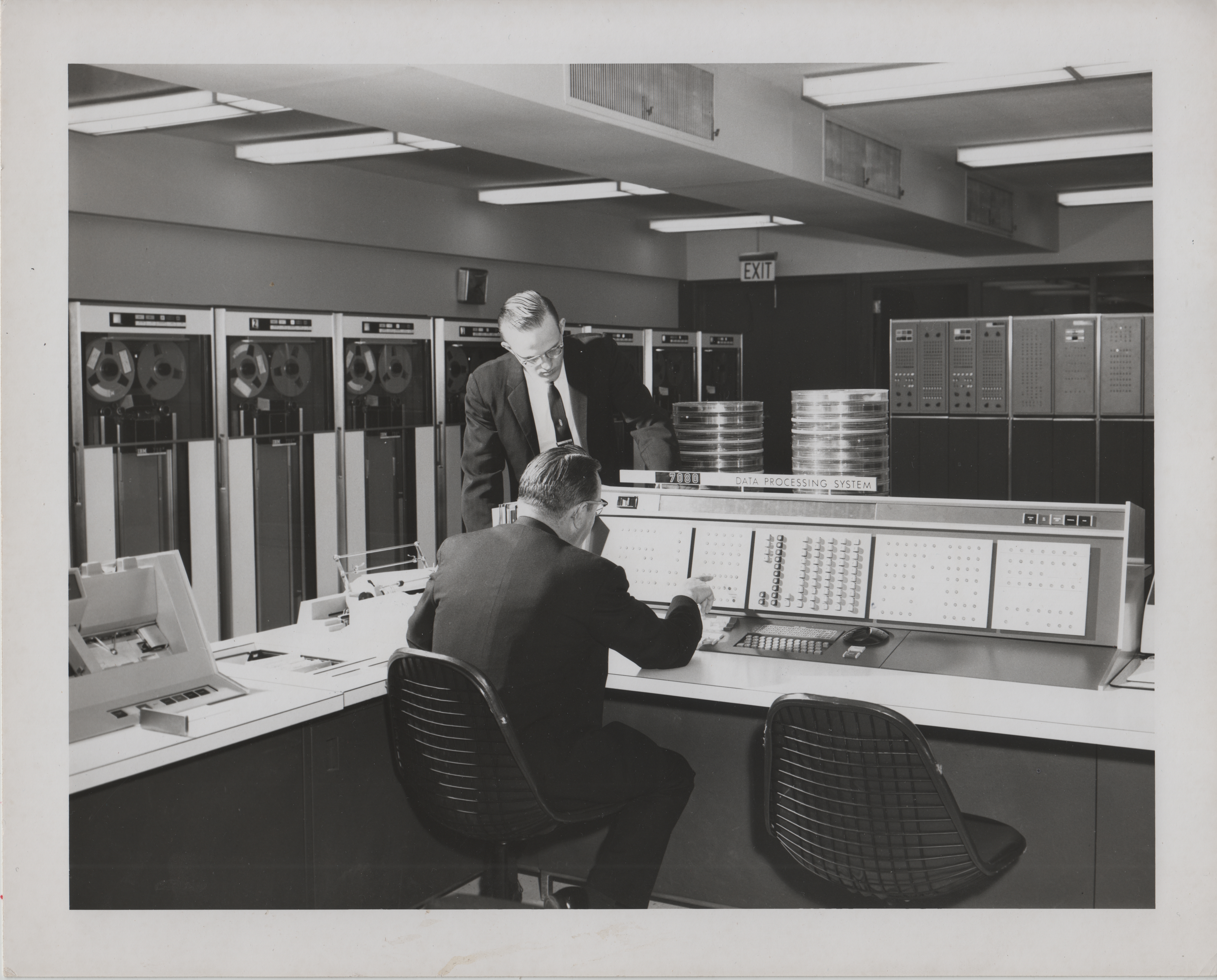
The IBM 7080 system: Visible are the IBM 7153 Console Control unit with IBM 7503 Console Card Reader (front left), as well as the IBM 729 Magnetic Tape units along left wall, the IBM 7621 Tape Control unit (back middle), and the IBM 7102 Arithmetic and Logical unit (back right), at IBM headquarters, White Plains, New York, 1961

The 7080 system included the IBM 7305 Central Storage and I/O Control unit, the IBM 7102 Arithmetic and Logical unit, the IBM 7302 Core Storage unit, the IBM 7153 Console Control unit, and the IBM 7804 Power unit. The IBM 7622 Signal Control unit could be added to the system to convert transistor signal levels to levels usable with first generation equipment, allowing all 705 peripherals, including punched card input/output with the IBM 7502 card reader, line printers and the IBM 727 magnetic tape drives, to be used on the 7080. Second generation IBM 729 magnetic tape drives connected to the CPU via the IBM 7621 Tape Control.
