= Vacuum column =

Vacuum column may refer to

- A device used in vacuum distillation
- A feature of a tape drive that serves as a low-inertia magnetic tape buffer: 9-track tape#Typical operation; Tape drive#Technical problems
