= 3420 =

3420 may refer to:

- A.D. 3420, a year in the 4th millennium CE
- 3420 BC, a year in the 4th millennium BCE
- 3420, a number in the 3000 (number) range

== Other uses ==
- 3420 Standish, an asteroid in the Asteroid Belt, the 3420th asteroid registered
- IBM 3420, a 9-track open reel tape drive unit
- Hawaii Route 3420, a state highway
- Texas Farm to Market Road 3420, a state highway
