= AN/FSQ-31 SAC Data Processing System =

US Air Force command, control, and coordination system

The IBM AN/FSQ-31 SAC Data Processing System (FSQ-31, Q-31, colloq.) was a USAF command, control, and coordination system for the Cold War Strategic Air Command (SAC). IBM's Federal Systems Division was the prime contractor for the AN/FSQ-31s, which were part of the TBD 465L SAC Automated Command and Control System (SACCS), a "Big L" system of systems (cf. 416L SAGE & 474L BMEWS) which had numerous sites throughout the Continental United States: "all SAC command posts and missile Launch Control Centers" (e.g., The Notch), a communication network, etc.; and the several FSQ-31 sites including:

- Offutt AFB's "Headquarters SAC Command Center" (DPC 1 & DPC 2 units)
- Combat Operations Center, Fifteenth Air Force, at March AFB (DPC 3),
- Barksdale AFB by March 1983.

The FSQ-31 provided data to a site's Data Display Central (DDC) "a wall display" (e.g., Iconorama), and it arrived at Offutt in 1960. On 20 February 1987, "SAC declared initial operational capability for the SAC Digital Network [which] upgraded the SAC Automated Command and Control system "

In accordance with the Joint Electronics Type Designation System (JETDS), the "AN/FSQ-31" designation represents the 31st design of an Army-Navy electronic device for fixed special combination system. The JETDS system also now is used to name all Department of Defense electronic systems.

== Description ==
The FSQ-31 included:

- IBM 4020 Military Computer with Programming and Numerical System and "Arithmetic Unit including storage access", liquid-cooled Ferrite Core storage (65,536 words), High-Speed Input/Output to the Drum Memory system, and the Low-Speed Input/Output section to interface with several different devices:

- Electronic Data Transmission Communications Central (EDTCC) at 4 "zone-of-interior headquarters bases" for EDT with "outlying" Remote Communications Centrals (e.g., routing "to RCC's, computer (DPC's), or the display devices.")
- Tape Controllers 1 and 2, connected to 16 IBM 729-V Tape Drives
- Disk File Controller, which was a modified Tape Controller, connected to the
  - Bryant PH 2000 Disk File, which had 24 disks that were 39 inches in diameter, 125 read/write heads that were hydraulically actuated, and had a total capacity of 26 MB
- IBM 1401, which controlled data transfers from unit-record equipment:
  - IBM 1402 Card Reader/Punch
  - IBM 1403 Line Printer
  - 2 IBM 729-V Tape Drives
- 2 IBM Selectric Typewriters, (I/O Typewriters) one of which was used for operational messages and the other for diagnostic messages and maintenance activities.

- Advanced Display Console
- Drum memory system with controller and two vertical drum memory devices. Each drum read and wrote 50 bits at a time in parallel so transferring data could be done quickly. The drums were organized as 17 fields with 8192 words per field for a total capacity of 139264 words. The motors that rotated the drums required 208 VAC at 45 Hz so a motor generator unit was required to change the frequency from 60 Hz. This added to the noise level in the computer room.
- Rockwell-Collins modem
- Water chilling system for maintaining the liquid coolant temperature in the IBM 4020

SACCS systems outside of the AN/FSQ-31 included the Subnet Communications Processor and the SACCS Software Test (SST) Facility at the Offutt command center (the backup SCP was at Barksdale AFB.) SAC's QOR for the National Survivable Communications System (NSCS) was issued 13 September 1958; and in September 1960 the "installation of a SAC display warning system" included 3 consoles in the Offutt command center.

Initial weight: 105,650 pounds (52.8 short tons; 47.9 t).

=== Memory ===
The Q-31s were equipped with four 16 kiloword memory banks. The memory bank was oil and water cooled. Also considered as part of the memory subsystem in that they were addressed via fixed reserved memory addresses, were four 48 position switch banks, in which a short program could be inserted, and a plugboard, similar to the one used in IBM unit record equipment, that had the capacity of 32 words, so longer bootstrap or diagnostic programs could be installed in plug panels which could then be inserted into the receptacle and used. This served as a primitive ROM.

External images
- terminal at Offutt command center
- SACCS comm network

== See also ==
- List of military electronics of the United States
