= IBM 728 =

Magnetic tape drive used on the SAGE AN/FSQ-7 computer

The IBM 728 was an IBM 7 series magnetic tape drive. It was used on the SAGE AN/FSQ-7 computer. It was physically similar to the IBM 727, but with significantly different specifications.

Tracks	6 Data, 1 synchronization
char/inch	248 char/inch
Words	6 chars (32 data bits, 1 odd parity bit, 3 end of file bits)
word/inch	41.33 word/inch
End of record gap	0.75 inch - 186 chars - 31 words
Tape speed	75 inch/s
Rewind speed	500 inch/s (average)
Transfer rate	18,750 char/s - 3,125 word/s
Start time	5 ms
Stop time	5 ms
Width of tape	1/2 inch
Length of reel	2,400 ft (730 m)
Composition	Mylar or cellulose acetate base

            Tape Word Bit Positions
 
            ----------------------------->   Tape travel
            LS   L6   L12  R2   R8   R14
            L1   L7   L13  R3   R9   R15
            L2   L8   L14  R4   R10  P
            SYN  SYN  SYN  SYN  SYN  SYN
            L3   L9   L15  R5   R11  EOF
            L4   L10  RS   R6   R12  EOF
            L5   L11  R1   R7   R13  EOF
            ----------------------------->   Tape travel
