= Graham Magnetics =

Maker of computer storage tape

- Type: Subsidiary of RBE Enterprises
- Industry: Magnetic tape
- Founded: 1964
- Headquarters: Graham, TX, USA
- Website: www.grahammagnetics.com

Graham Magnetics, Inc., was an American computer data storage company independently active from 1964 to 1995. Founded as Datatape, Inc., by 1966, it had opened its new magnetic tape factory in Graham, TX and changed its name to Graham Magnetics. Until the 1980s, Graham's primary product was half-inch, open-reel magnetic tape. Graham was the last manufacturer of open-reel 9-track tape, but ceased production at the end of 2001. Currently, as of 2007, Graham Magnetics buys used tape cartridges and reconditions them for reuse.

For the period 1995–1999, Graham was a part of Anacomp Corp. During this time, Anacomp/Graham was the world leader in open-reel computer tape production and one of 3 major manufacturers of IBM 3480 Family tape cartridges. They sold tape under the Graham, Memorex, and other brands.

In 1999, Anacomp spun off the magnetic tape line of business as eMag Solutions. This included the Graham magnetics division. After ending 9-track magnetic tape production, Graham entered the business of recertifying tape cartridges. In 2006, the company developed a process for eradicating data from tape cartridges while preserving the servo tracks.

In 2007, eMag sold Graham to RBE Enterprises of Dallas, TX.
