= IBM 7-track =

Magnetic tape format introduced by IBM in 1952

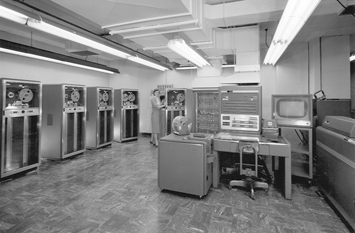
An IBM 704 mainframe with IBM 727 seven-track tape drives on the left

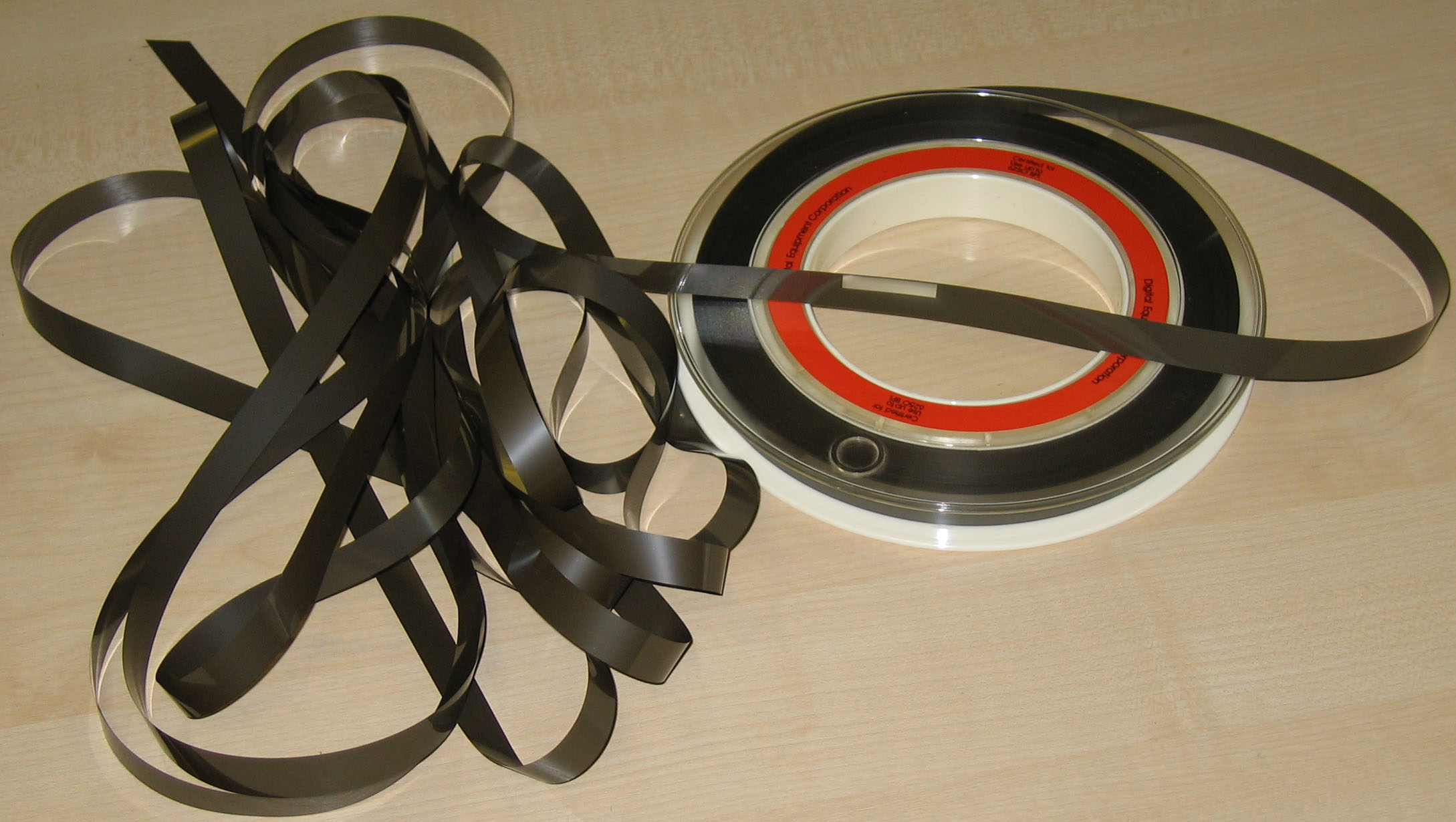
Reel of half-inch tape showing beginning-of-tape reflective marker

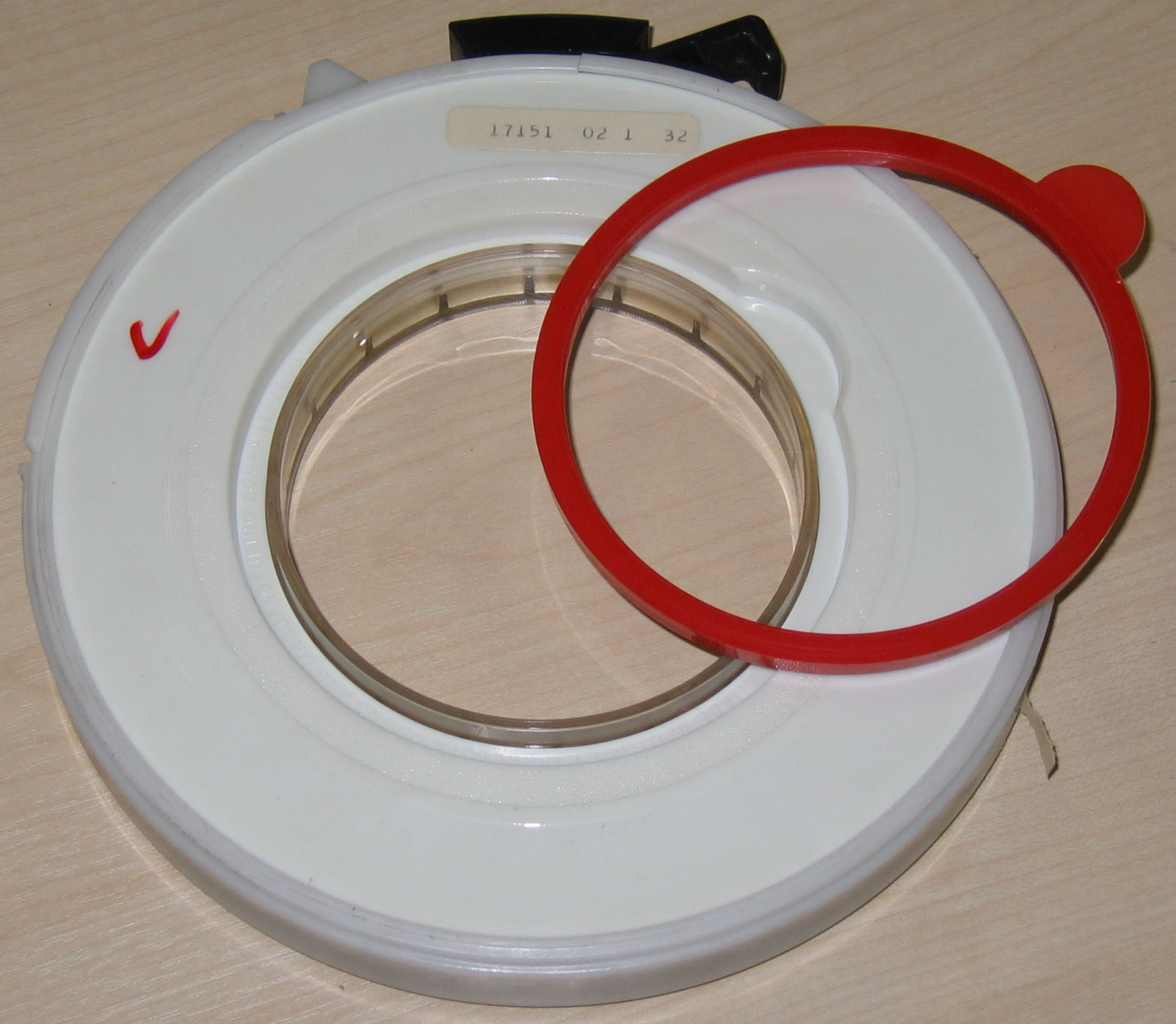
A write ring had to be inserted in the back of a reel to allow its tape to be written on.

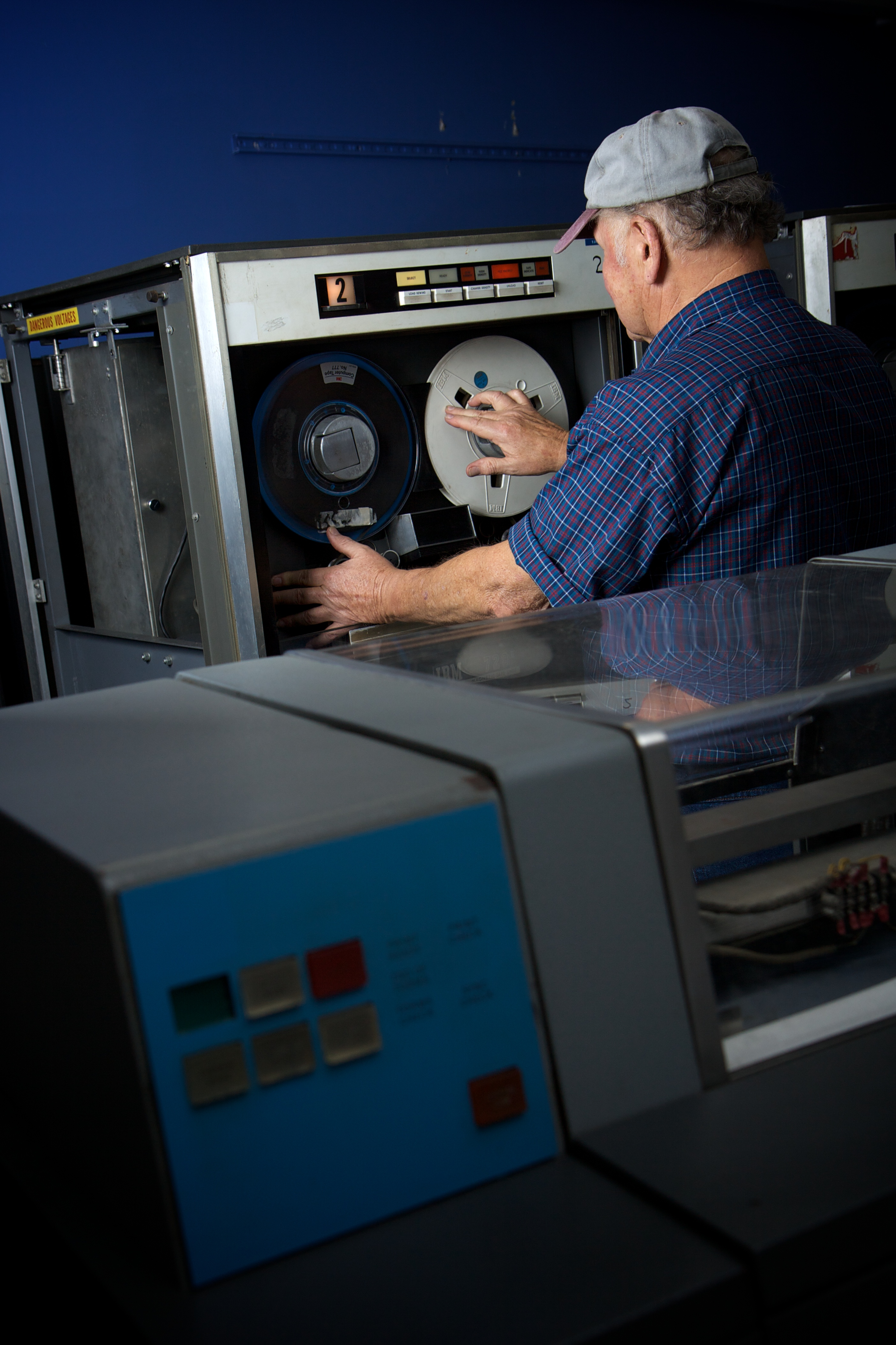
A reel of half-inch magnetic tape being loaded onto an IBM 729 tape drive that is attached to an IBM 1401 being restored at the Computer History Museum

IBM's first magnetic-tape data storage devices, introduced in 1952, use what is now generally known as 7-track tape. The magnetic tape is 1/2 inch (13 mm) wide, and there are six data tracks plus one parity track for a total of seven parallel tracks that span the length of the tape. Data is stored as six-bit characters, with each bit of the character and the additional parity bit stored in a different track.

These tape drives were mechanically sophisticated floor-standing drives that used vacuum columns to buffer long U-shaped loops of tape. Between active control of powerful reel motors and vacuum control of these U-shaped tape loops, extremely rapid start and stop of the tape at the tape-to-head interface could be achieved. When active, the two tape reels thus fed tape into or pulled tape out of the vacuum columns, intermittently spinning in rapid, unsynchronized bursts resulting in visually striking action. Stock shots of such vacuum-column tape drives in motion were widely used to represent "the computer" in films and television.

== Technical details ==
Density
Initial recording density was 100 characters per inch. Later models supported 200, 556 and 800 characters per inch.
Inter-record gap
A gap (initially one inch, later 3/4 inch) between records allowed the mechanism time to start and stop the tape.
Latency
There was only a 1.5 ms delay for the stopped tape to reach its full reading or writing speed.
Markers
Aluminum strips were glued several feet from the ends of the tape to serve as logical beginning and end of tape markers.
Write protection
A removable plastic ring in the back of the tape reel was inserted to indicate that writing should be permitted.

== Generations ==
| | IBM model | | | | |
| | 726 | 727 | 728 | 729 | 7330 |
|---|---|---|---|---|---|
| Density (chars/in) | 100 | 200 | 248 | 200, 556, 800 | 200, 556 |
| Tape speed (in/s) | 75 | 75 | 75 | 75 (112.5) | 36 |
| Transfer rate (chars/s) | 7,500 | 15,000 | 18,750 | 15,000 41,700 60,000 (22,500 62,500 90,000) | 7,200 20,016 |
| End-of-record gap | 1 inch 100 chars 16.67 words | 0.75 inches 150 chars 25 words | 0.75 inches 186 chars 31 words | 0.75 inches 150, 417, 600 chars 25, 69.5, 100 words | 0.75 inches 150, 417 chars |
| Rewind speed (in/s, avg.) | 75, read backwards | 500 | 500 | | |
| Start time (ms) | 10 | 5 | 5 | | |
| Stop time (ms) | 10 | 5 | 5 | | |
| Max. length of reel (ft) | 1,400 | 2,400 | 2,400 | 2,400 | 2,400 |
| Base composition | cellulose acetate | PET film or cellulose acetate | PET film or cellulose acetate | PET film | PET film |

=== IBM 726 ===
The IBM 726 dual magnetic tape reader/recorder for the IBM 701 was announced on May 21, 1952.

=== IBM 727 ===
The IBM 727 Magnetic Tape Unit was announced for the IBM 701 and IBM 702 on September 25, 1953. It became IBM's standard tape drive for their vacuum tube era computer systems. It was withdrawn on May 12, 1971.

=== IBM 728 ===
The IBM 728 magnetic tape drive was used on the SAGE AN/FSQ-7 computer. It was physically similar to the IBM 727, but with significantly different specifications.

- tracks: 6 data, 1 synchronization,
- words: 6 chars (32 data bits, 1 parity bit, 3 end-of-file bits),
- words/inch: 41.33.

=== IBM 729 ===
The IBM 729 Magnetic Tape Unit was IBM's iconic tape mass storage system from the late 1950s through the mid-1960s. It was used on late 700, most 7000 and many 1400 series computers. A new dual gap head assembly allowed read-after-write verification.

=== IBM 7330 ===
The IBM 7330 Magnetic Tape Unit was a low-cost slower tape system. It was common on 1400 series computers.

=== IBM 2400 Series ===
The 2400 Series Magnetic Tape Units were introduced with the System/360. Most were IBM 9 Track format drives, but they could be ordered with seven-track read/write heads, allowing them to read and write seven-track tapes.

=== Legacy ===
As of 2020, IBM still sells magnetic tape cartridge drives using half-inch wide tape in the Linear Tape-Open and 3592 formats.

== Sources ==
- IBM 726 Magnetic tape reader/recorder
- IBM 727 Magnetic tape unit
- Bitsavers.org Magnetic Tape Equipment manuals (PDF files)
  - A22-6589-1_magTapeReference_Jun62.pdf – Reference manual for 7 track drives
- IBM 727 Magnetic tape unit (photo) Sold with 705 in 1955.
