= Anacomp =

- Type: Private
- Industry: Computer services, document management
- Founded: 1968
- Headquarters: Chantilly, Virginia, United States
- Website: www.anacomp.com

Anacomp, Inc., is an American company that specializes in computer services and document management. It was founded in Indianapolis, Indiana, in 1968 by Ronald D. Palamara, Robert R. Sadaka, and J. Melvin Ebbert, three professors at Purdue University. Their goal was to direct the power of the computer toward the disciplines of investment management, education, urban analysis, computer science and civic systems, but is now headquartered in Chantilly, Virginia. The name Anacomp is a combination of the words ANAlyze and COMPute.

As of 2008, Anacomp's business was primarily in the service and document management sectors. In 2010, Anacomp sold off its CaseLogistix product line to Thomson Reuters. CaseLogistix is a document review application used by law firms for document review and subsequent case preparation.

== Acquisitions ==
Since its inception, Anacomp has made many acquisitions and spin-offs and has entered and exited different lines of business.

In 1987, Anacomp acquired Datagraphix Inc. for $128 million.

In 1988, Anacomp acquired Xidex for $415 million.

In 1998, Anacomp acquired First Image Management Company.

In 2007, Anacomp acquired CaseLogistix.

== See also ==
- Document management system
- Graham Magnetics
