= IBM 4020 Military Computer =

The IBM 4020 Military Computer was a Cold War era military computer. Two of them were used in the two IBM AN/FSQ-31 SAC Data Processing Systems.

Details:

- Instruction rate : Up to 400,000 instructions per second
- Cycle time : 2.5 microseconds
- Word size : 48 bits + 2 parity bits
- Core storage : up to 131,072 words
- operates in parallel mode
- 69 instructions
- single address instructions
- Add or subtract : 2.5 microseconds (fixed point)
- Add or subtract : 7.7 to 26 μs (floating point)
- Multiply : average 24 μs (24 bit precision fixed point)
- Multiply : 5 to 74 μs (floating point)
- Multiprocessing with Automatic Priority

The instruction format includes:

- 7 bit op code
- 2 bit real data indicator
- 3 bit byte displacement
- 3 bit mode selector
- 1 sign bit
- 8 bit 'byte activity'
- 1 bit Double index flag
- 1 bit Indirect address flag
- 4 bit index register selection
- 18 bit address.

Man-machine communications included a light-gun to indicate an area of interest on a visual display unit.

Circuit logic packaging was based on 7 types of Q-pacs each holding 1 to 4 circuits. Transistors and semiconductor diodes were soldered to the outside of the Q-pac encapsulation for ease of cooling and replacement.
