= IBM 7330 =

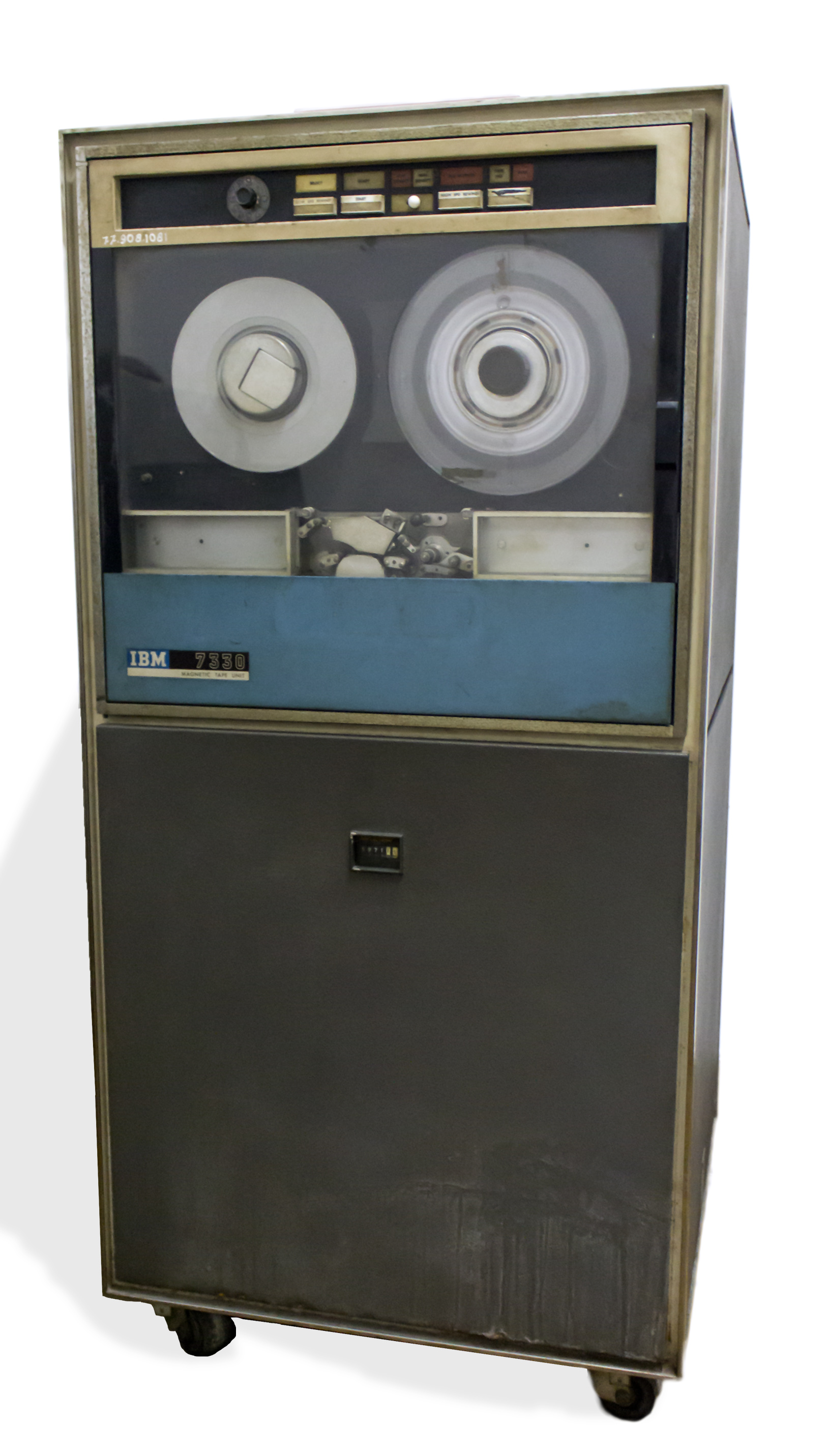
IBM 7330 data tape storage unit once used by the Indonesian Army

The IBM 7330 Magnetic Tape Unit was IBM's low-cost tape mass storage system through the 1960s. Part of the IBM 7 track family of tape units, it was used mostly on 1400 series computers and the IBM 7040/7044.

== Data format ==
The tape had seven parallel tracks, six for data and one for parity. Like other IBM systems, the 7330 used 1/2 inch (12.7 mm) magnetic tape up to 2,400 feet (730 m) long wound on reels up to 10 1/2 inches (266.7 mm) diameter. Tapes with character data (BCD) were recorded in even parity. Binary tapes used odd parity. (709 manual p. 20) Aluminum strips were glued several feet from the ends of the tape to serve as beginning and end of tape markers. Write protection was provided by a removable plastic ring in the back of the tape reel. A ¾ inch gap between records allowed the mechanism time to stop the tape. At 200 characters per inch, a single 2,400-foot tape could store the equivalent of some 50,000 punched cards (about 4,000,000 six-bit bytes).

Low speed (36 in/s) dual density (200, 556).
