= IBM 729 =

Tape storer and reader

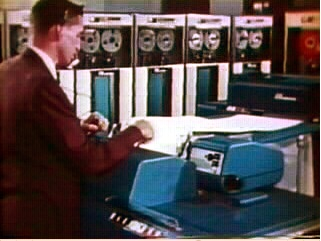
A bank of IBM 729 tape drives

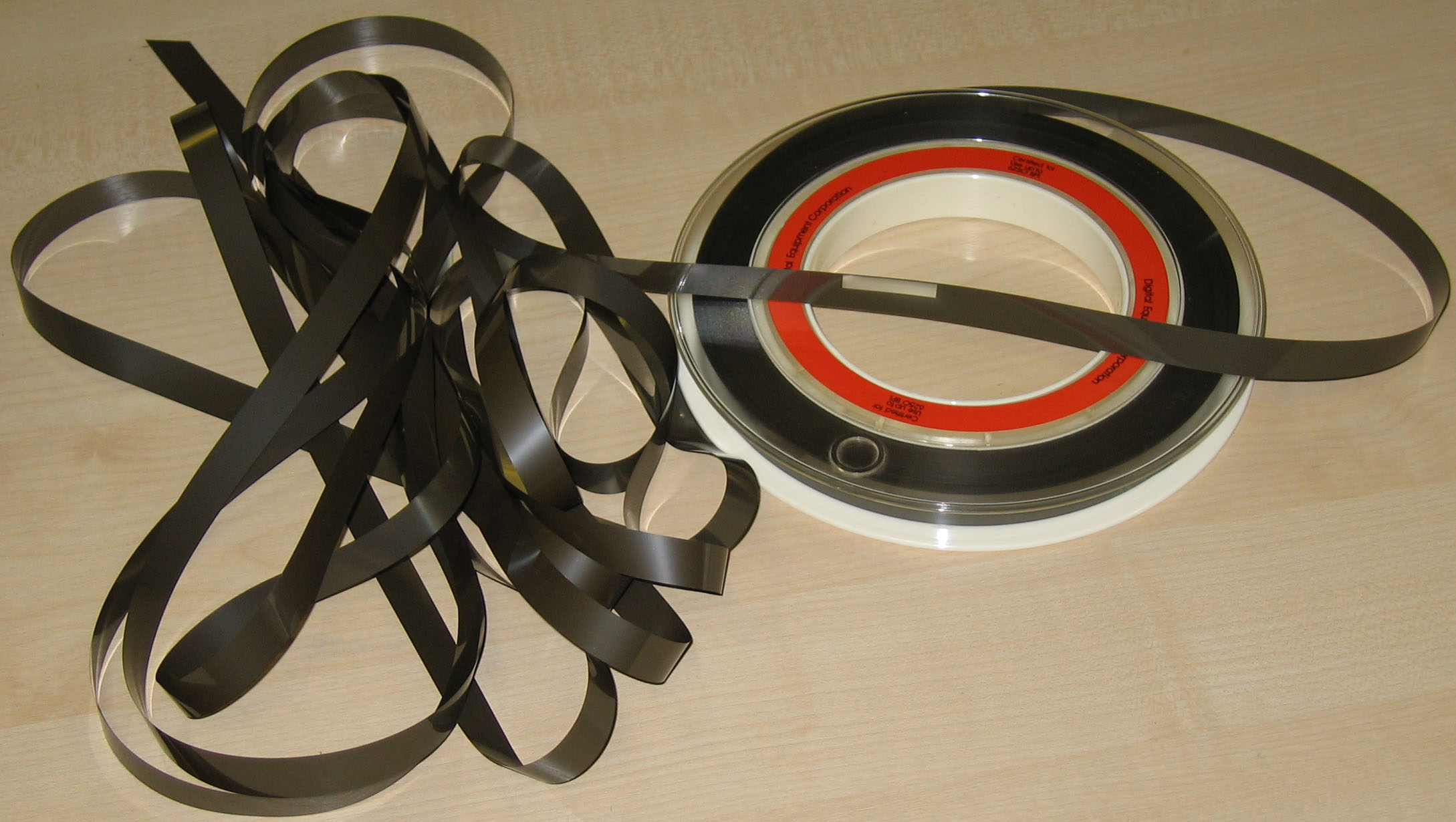
Reel of tape showing beginning-of-tape reflective marker

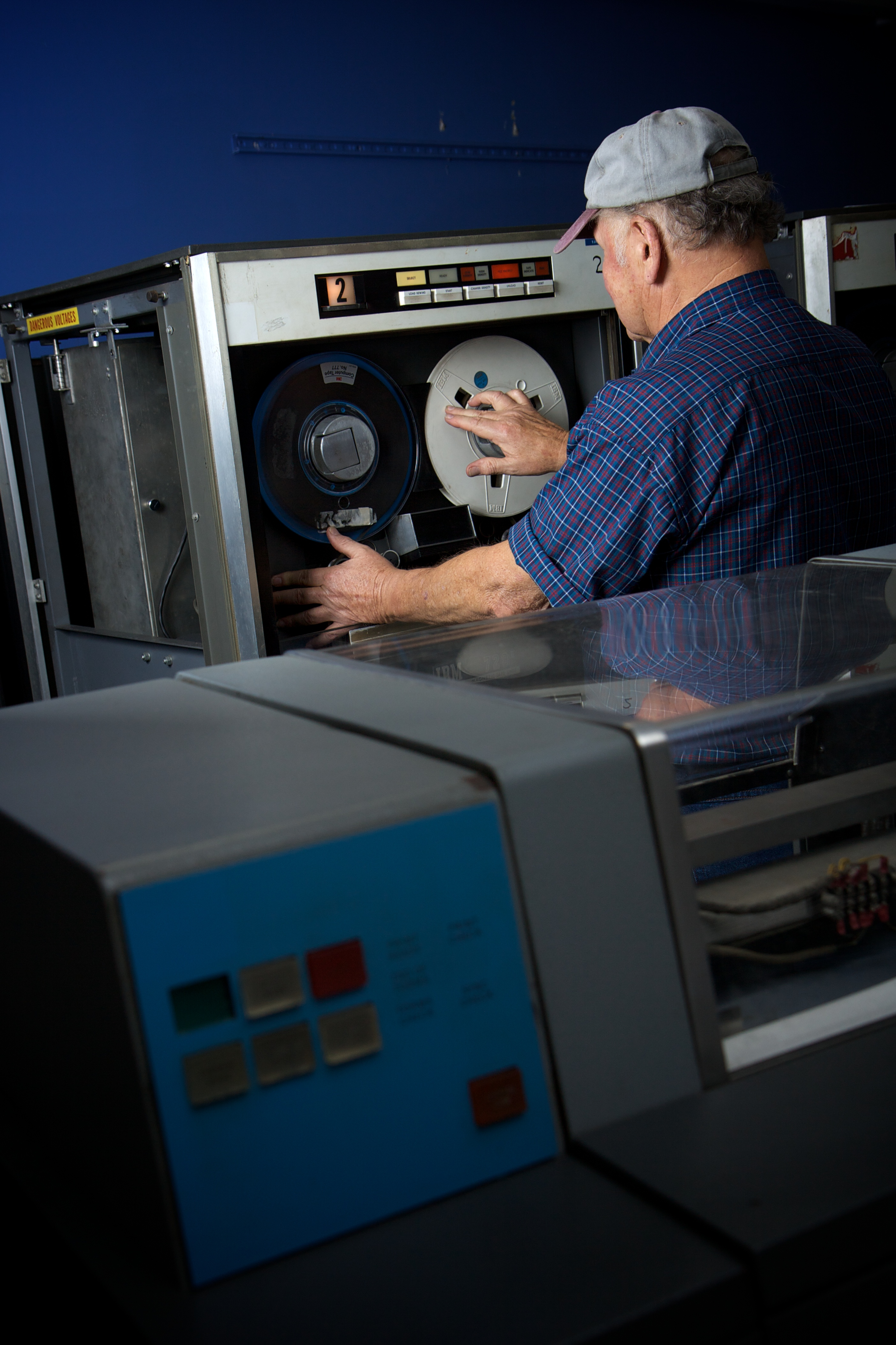
An IBM 729 tape drive being debugged as part of the Computer History Museum's IBM 1401 restoration project. A reel of magnetic tape is being loaded onto the drive. The operator's finger is holding the tape in place on the take-up reel as he takes a few turns to secure the tape leader. An IBM 1403 line printer is in the foreground.

The IBM 729 Magnetic Tape Unit was IBM's tape mass storage system from the late 1950s through the mid-1960s. Part of the IBM 7-track family of tape units, it was used on late 700, most 7000 and many 1400 series computers. Like its predecessor, the IBM 727 and many successors, the 729 used 1/2 inch (13 mm) magnetic tape up to 2,400 feet (730 m) long wound on reels up to 10 1/2 inches (270 mm) diameter. To allow rapid tape acceleration (and thus reduced seek/access times), long vacuum columns were placed between the tape reels and the read/write heads to absorb sudden increases in tape tension which would otherwise break the tape. Write protection was provided by a removable plastic ring in the back of the tape reel.

== Data format ==
The tape had seven parallel tracks, six for data and one to maintain parity. Tapes with character data (BCD) were recorded in even parity. Binary tapes used odd parity (709 manual, p. 20). Aluminum strips were glued several feet from the ends of the tape to serve as physical beginning and end of tape markers. Write protection was provided by a removable plastic ring in the back of the tape reel. A 3/4 inch gap between records allowed the mechanism enough time to stop the tape. Initial tape speed was 75 inches per second (2.95 m/s) and recording density was 200 characters per inch, giving a payload transfer speed of 90 kbit/s (105 kbit/s including parity bits). Later 729 models supported 556 and 800 characters/inch and 112.5 in/s (payload transfer rates up to 540 kbit/s; raw transfer rates up to 630 kbit/s). At 200 characters per inch, a single 2400-foot tape could store the equivalent of some 50,000 punched cards (about 4,000,000 six-bit bytes, a data quantity equivalent to three million octets).

The 729 series was superseded by 9-track tape drives introduced with the IBM System/360.

== Models ==
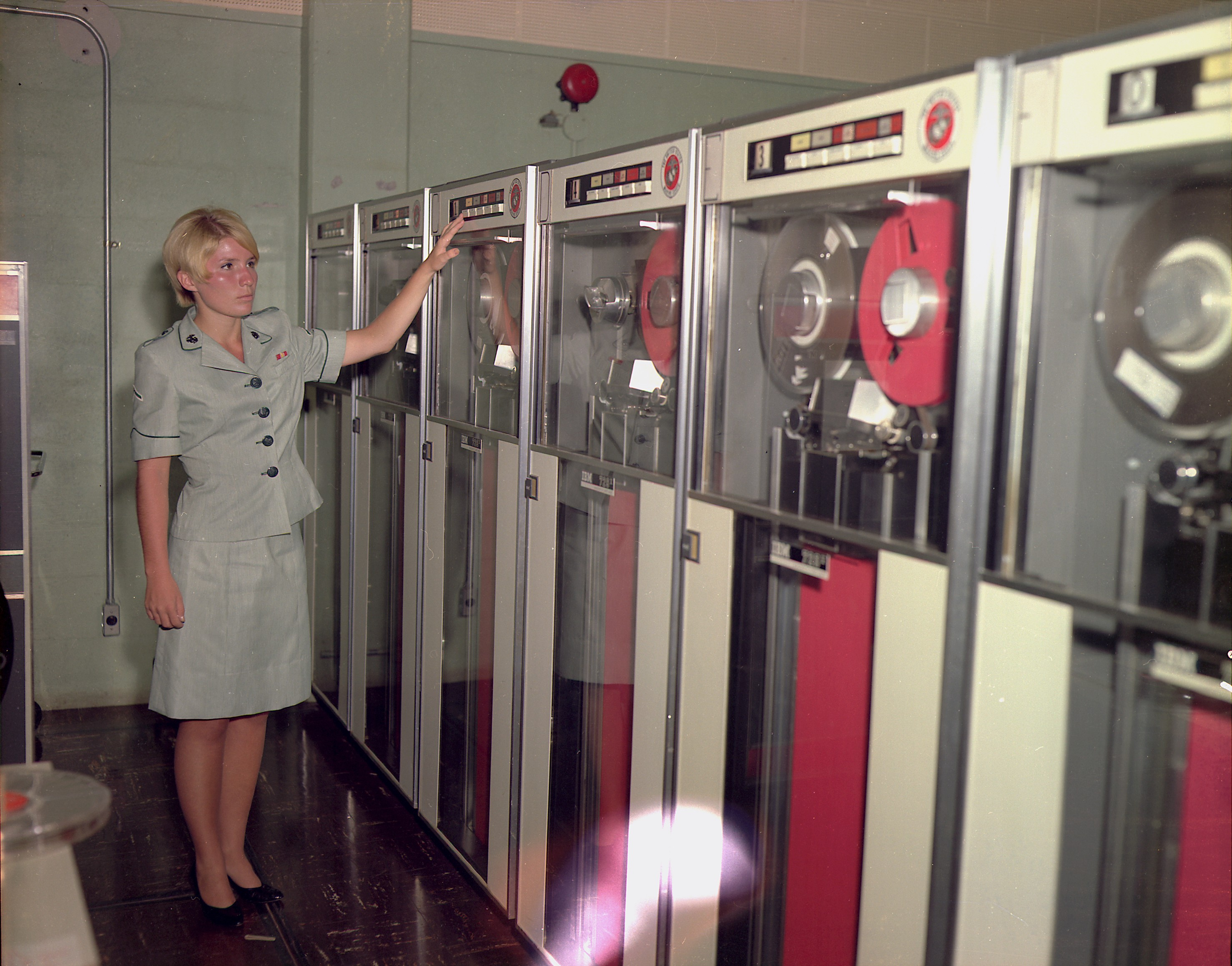
PFC Patricia Barbeau operates an IBM 729 at Camp Smith, Hawaii, in 1969

- 729 I: The IBM 729 I was introduced for the IBM 709 and IBM 705 III computers, looked identical to the IBM 727, and used vacuum tubes. The main improvement was the use of a dual gap head permitting write verify.
- 729 II: The IBM 729 II was introduced for the IBM 7000 series computers, introducing a new cabinet style and transistorized circuitry. Supported dual density (200, 556).
- 729 III: High speed (112.5 in/s) single density (556).
- 729 IV: High speed (112.5 in/s) dual density (200, 556).
- 729 V: High density (800).
- 729 VI: High speed (112.6 in/s) high density (800). Introduced September 1961.

== See also ==
- IBM 7330, a less expensive 7-track tape drive
