= 9-track tape =

Magnetic tape format introduced by IBM in 1964

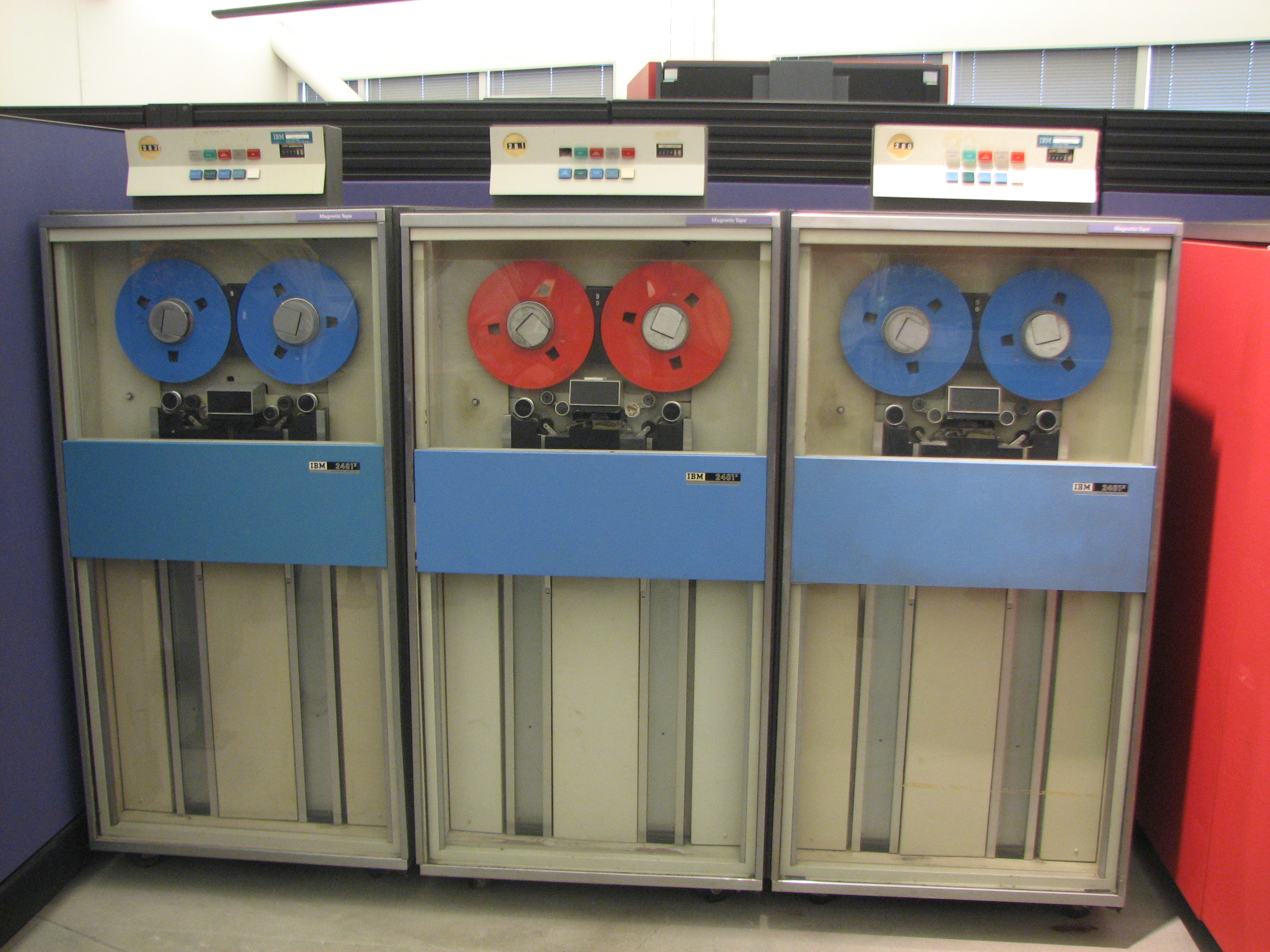
IBM 2401 System/360 tape drives that introduced the 9-track format

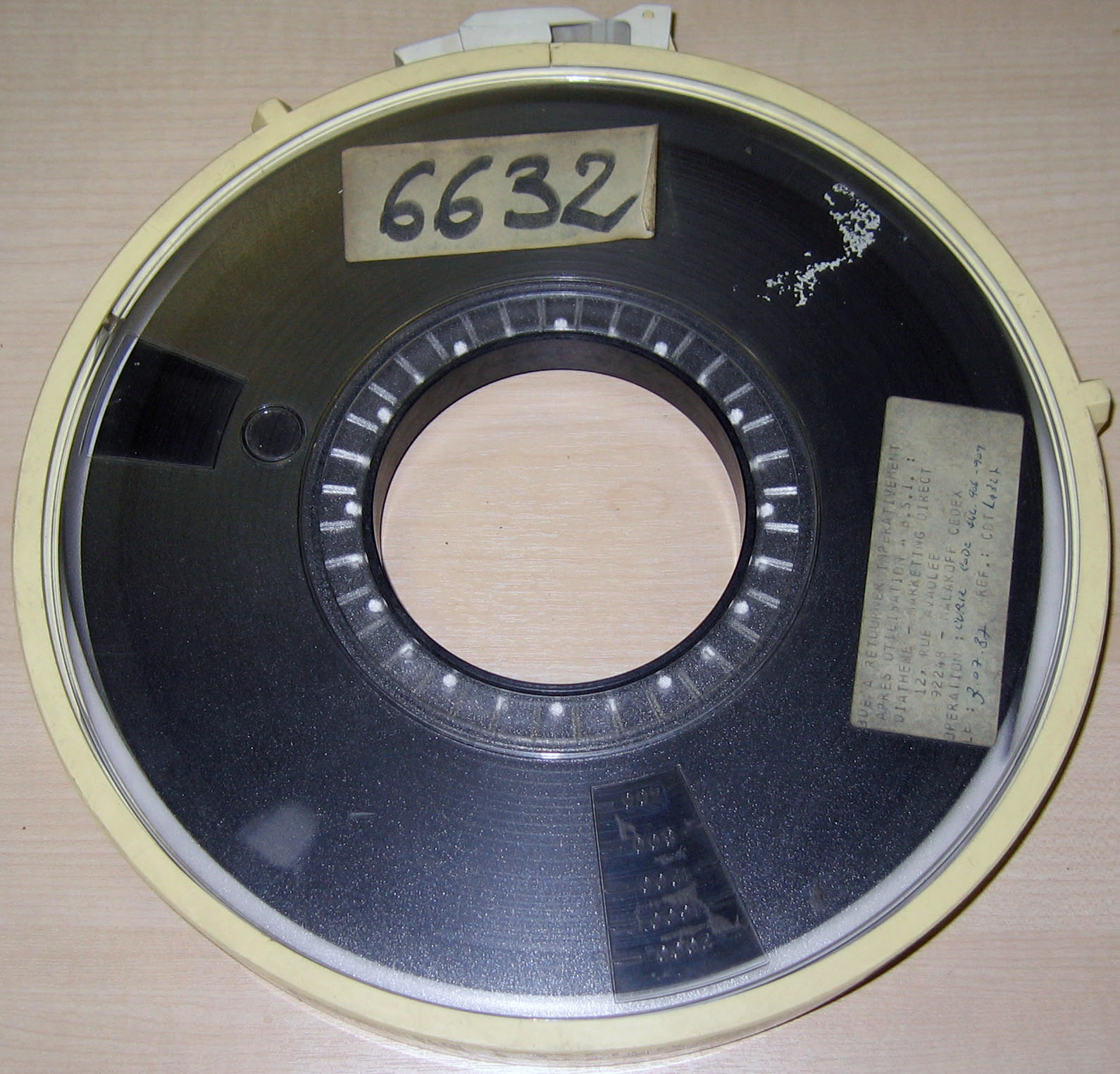
Full-size reel of 9-track tape

9-track tape is a format for magnetic-tape data storage, introduced with the IBM System/360 in 1964. The 1/2 inch (12.7 mm) wide magnetic tape media and reels have the same size as the earlier IBM 7-track format it replaced, but the new format has eight data tracks and one parity track for a total of nine parallel tracks. Data is stored as 8-bit characters, spanning the full width of the tape (including the parity bit). Various recording methods have been employed during its lifetime as tape speed and data density increased, including PE (phase encoding), GCR (group-coded recording), and NRZI (non-return-to-zero, inverted, sometimes pronounced "nur-zee"). Tapes come in various sizes up to 3,600 feet (1,100 m) in length.

The standard size of a byte was effectively set at eight bits with the S/360 and nine-track tape.

For over 30 years, the format dominated offline storage and data transfer, but by the end of the 20th century it was obsolete, and the last manufacturer of tapes ceased production in early 2002, with drive production ending the next year.

== Typical operation ==
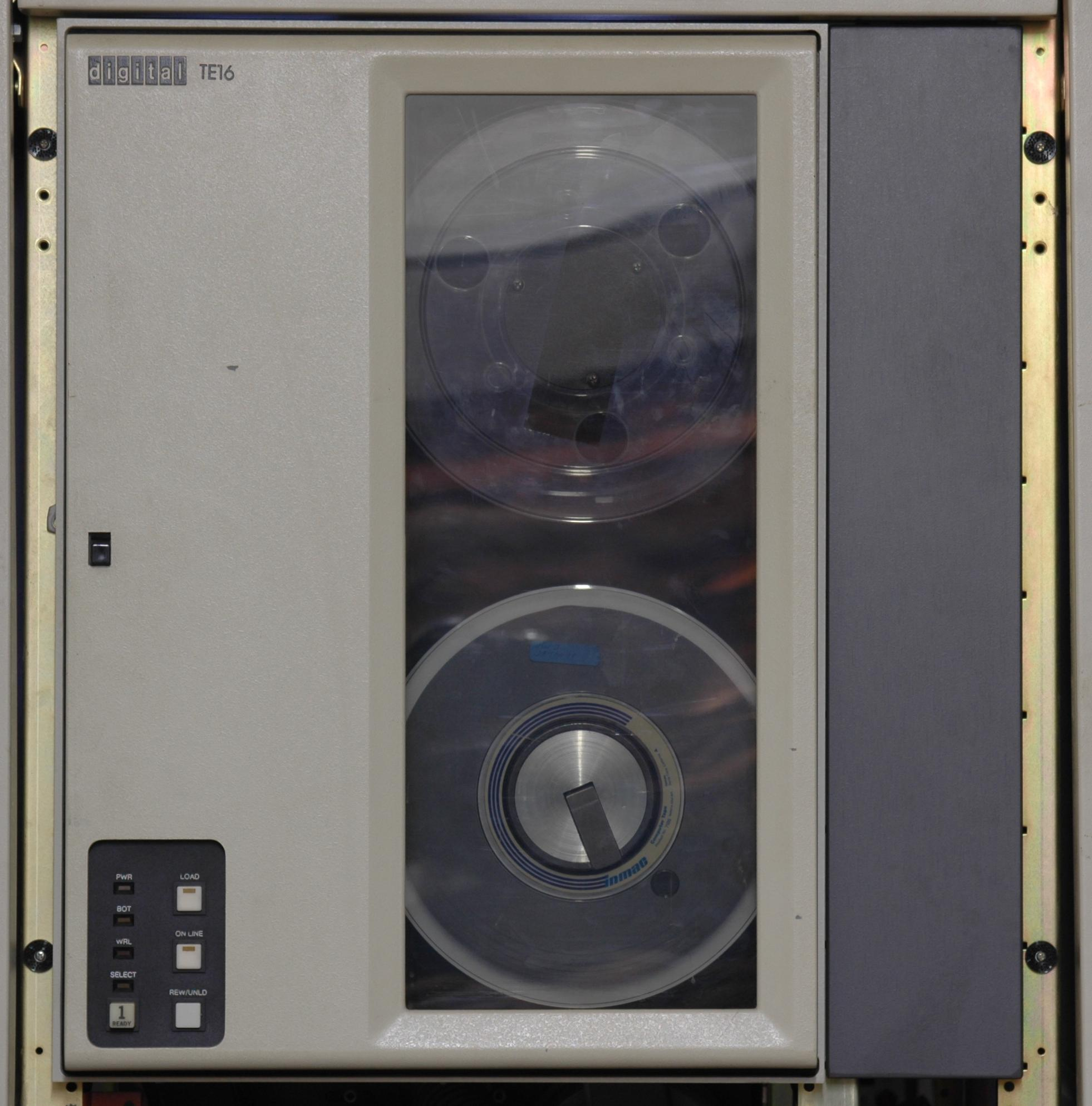
9-track tape drive used with DEC minicomputers

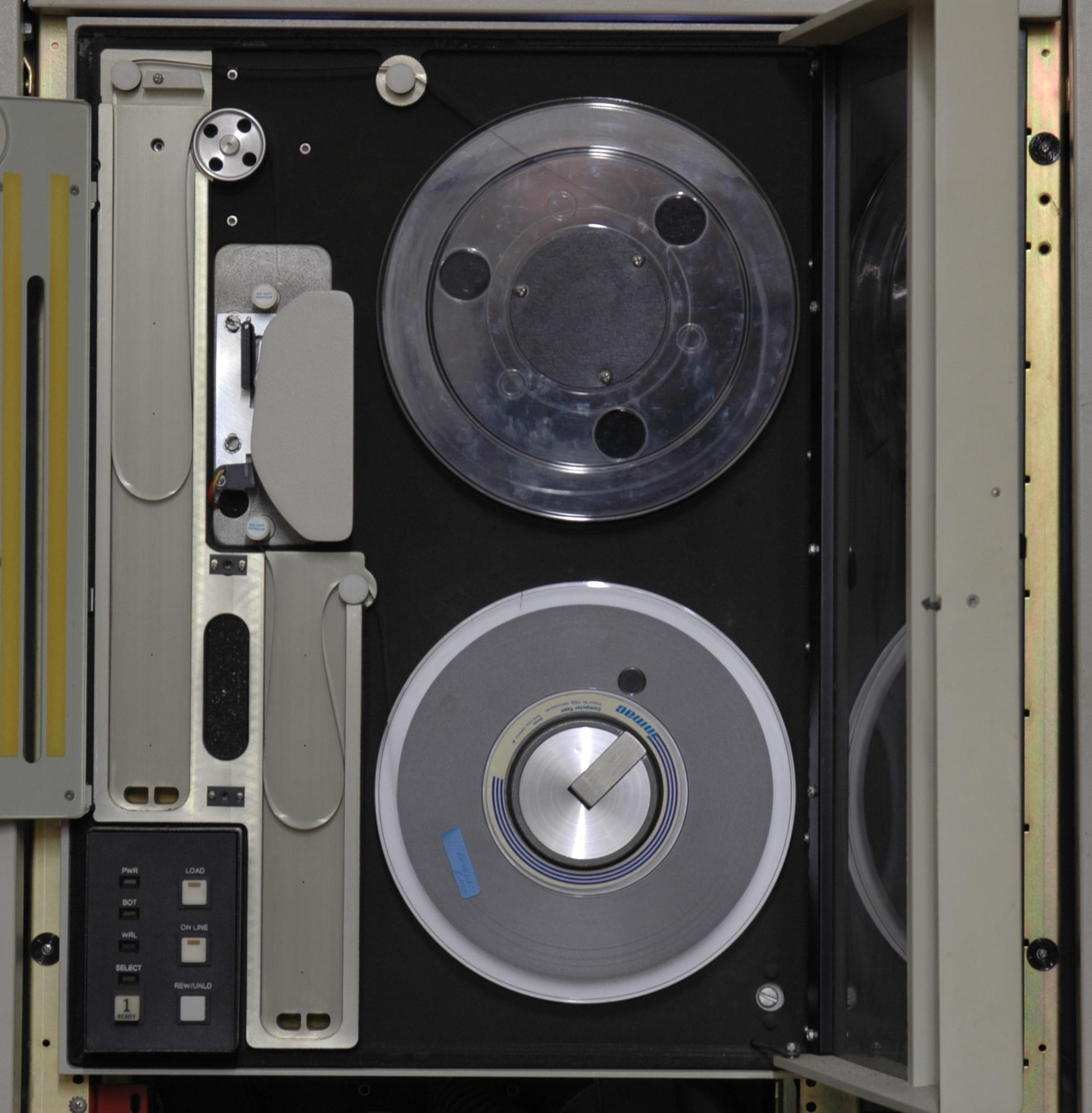
Inside a 9-track tape drive. The vacuum columns are the two gray rectangles on the left.

A typical 9-track unit consists of a tape transport—essentially all the mechanics that moves tape from reel to reel past the read/write and erase heads—and supporting control and data read/write electronics. The transport typically consists of a supply motor, a take-up motor, hubs for locking the tape reels in place, a capstan motor (though not necessarily a pinch roller, see below), tape head assembly, miscellaneous rollers which keep the tape in a precise path during operation, and vacuum columns which prevent tape 'snatch'. Data can become corrupted by stretched tape or variations in tape speed, so the transport has to guide the tape through without damaging its edges, move it with minimal wow and flutter, and give it a tension that is low but sufficient to keep the tape in constant contact with the read/write head.

To load a tape, an operator removes the protective cover (frequently called a "tape seal belt" because its purpose is to prevent humidity and dust on the media) from the outside of the tape reel and installs the tape on the supply hub, then threads the tape leader through the various roller assemblies and onto the take-up reel, installing three or four winds of tape to provide enough friction for the take-up motor to be able to pull the tape. The operator then initiates an automatic sequence, often by a single press of a button, that closes the protective window, starts the vacuum system, then moves the tape forward until the beginning-of-tape (BOT) foil strip is detected by an optical sensor in the tape path. The control electronics then indicate to the controlling computer that the unit is ready for operation.

Like its audio counterpart, moving tape past the read/write heads on a nine-track digital tape drive requires precise control, accomplished by a capstan motor. The capstan motor is designed for very smooth operation. Feedback to the control electronics is accomplished by a tachometer, usually an optical "tone wheel", to control tape velocity. Starting and stopping the capstan is controlled by ramp generators to ensure a properly sized inter-record gap, the gap between blocks of information.

The vacuum system provides a physical buffer between the precision movements of the capstan and the large movements of the reels by storing a short length of tape in the vacuum column under relatively low tension. The vacuum columns are chambers open at one end, the openings being in line with the tape path before and after the capstan and roller assemblies. The amount of tape in the column is controlled by four optical or vacuum sensors on the sides of the columns. The control electronics keep the curve of the tape loop between the two inner sensors, cueing the supply reel to feed more or stop, and the take-up reel to take more or stop, as necessary. The outer two sensors, at the very top and bottom of the columns, serve to sense malfunctions in the feed mechanism during operation, prompting the control electronics to shut off all operation of the tape transport and vacuum system to prevent damaging the tape. Because of the tension provided by the vacuum columns and the design of the tape path, tape is usually kept in sufficient contact with the relatively high-friction coating on the capstan that a pinch roller is not used.

Tape motion on many systems is bidirectional, i.e. tape can be read either forward or backward at the request of the controlling computer. Because the supply vacuum column keeps a small, constant tension in the reverse direction, the capstan can feed backwards without the tape bunching up or jumping out of its path. Unlike most audio tape systems, the capstan and head assemblies are always in contact with the tape, even during fast forward and reverse operations, only moving the head assembly away from the tape path during high-speed rewind. On some units, manufacturers provided a "fast search" capability which can move the tape quickly a certain number of blocks, then bring the tape to a halt and go back to read the requested data at normal speed.

Tapes include an end-of-tape (EOT) foil strip. When EOT is encountered while writing, the computer program is notified of the condition. This gives the program a chance to write end-of-tape information on the tape while there is still enough tape to do so.

The sensing of BOT and EOT is achieved by shining a small lamp at the tape's surface at an oblique angle. When the foil strip (glued to the tape) moves past the lamp a photo-receptor sees the reflected flash of light and triggers the system to halt tape motion. This is the main reason that photographic flash cameras are not allowed in data centers with 9-track tape drives since they can trick the tape drives into falsely sensing BOT and EOT.

The above describes a typical transport system; however, manufacturers engineered many alternative designs. For example, some designs use a horizontal transport deck where the operator simply sets the tape reel in the supply reel bay, closes the door and presses the load button, then a vacuum system draws the tape along the path and onto a take-up hub within the mechanism. Some designs eliminate the vacuum columns in favor of a microprocessor-controlled direct drive design.

== Technical details ==
Nine-track 800 NRZI and 1600 PE (phase encoding) tapes use a 0.6 inches (15 mm) inter-record gap (IRG) between data records to allow the tape to stop and start between records. 6250 GCR tapes use a tighter 0.3 inches (7.6 mm) IRG.

Nine-track tapes have reflective stickers placed on the non-data side 10 feet (3.0 m) from the beginning of the tape and 14 feet (4.3 m) from the end of the tape to facilitate signaling the hardware to prevent the tape from unwinding from the hubs. These reflective stickers establish the beginning-of-tape (BOT) and end-of-tape (EOT) marks. 10 feet (3.0 m) of leader and trailer tape is sufficiently long to allow the tape to go down and up the air columns and wrap around the hub a few times. The extra 4 feet (1.2 m) in the trailer is to allow the operating system space to write a few blocks of data after the EOT mark to finalize the tape data segment in a multi-volume dataset. Operators commonly clip off a few inches of leader tape when it becomes frayed. If the leading reflective strip becomes detached from the tape it becomes difficult to read the data, since the BOT point of the dataset is no longer easily located and BOT orientation is nearly impossible. When this happens a new BOT strip is added to the tape and its former data is considered lost.

Nine-track tapes have densities of 800, 1600, and 6250 8-bit bytes per inch, giving approximately 22.5MB, 45MB and 175MB respectively on a tape with the usual length of 2,400 feet (730 m).

== IBM generations ==
IBM Model	2400 Series	3400 Series
Model numbers	2401, 2415, 2420	3410, 3420, 3422, 3440
Density (bits/in/track)	800, 1600	800, 1600, 6250
Tape speed (in/s)	18.75–200	75–200
Transfer rate (byte/s)	15,000–320,000	1,250,000
Interblock gap (in)	0.6	0.3-0.6
Rewind speed (full reel)	1–4 minutes	51–180 seconds
Start time (ms)		
Stop time (ms)		
Length of reel (ft)	2400 max	2400 max
Base composition	Plastic	Plastic

=== 2400 Series ===
The 2400 Series Magnetic Tape Units were introduced with the System/360 and were the first to use 9-track tape. The dimensions of the tape and reels are identical to those used with 7-track units, such as the IBM 729. But older 7-track tapes can be read and written only on special 2400 drives equipped with 7-track read and write heads and the 7-track compatibility option.

=== 3400 Series ===
Panel of IBM 3803 controller for up to eight 3400 tape drives

The 3400 Series Magnetic Tape Units were introduced with the IBM System/370. The primary advantages of the 3400 system are the higher data density (6250 BPI) and support of the "autoloader" cartridge, first seen in the IBM 2420 model 7. Prior to the autoloader cartridge, tapes were sealed in a plastic "tape seal belt" that surrounded the reel and provided contamination protection and rack-hanging capability. The 3420's autoloader cartridge enables the tape operator to mount the reel directly on the hub without having to remove the seal belt. This provides a significant time saving and reduces operator errors, since the operator does not have to remove/replace the belt or thread the tape onto the take-up reel.

=== Other IBM units ===
While the earlier tape drives have vacuum columns, some IBM tape drives such as the 8809 drive (1980s) have a flat mount situation and no vacuum columns exist. Tapes are manually mounted and threaded. The drive supports both 800 and 1600 bpi. This drive is used on the IBM System/36. On the IBM AS/400 and iSeries there is the 9348-012 and it is a table top drive, flat mounting, but it autoloads the tape reel and auto threads it. The 9348 supports 1600 and 6250 bpi density tapes.

=== Other information ===
The maximum data capacity of a 2400 ft reel, with 32,767 byte blocks and recorded at 6250 BPI is 170 megabytes. Typically, much smaller block sizes, such as 4K (4,096 bytes) are used, in which case the storage capacity of the tape is reduced to 113 megabytes.

Depending on the operating system, tapes are formatted as either EBCDIC (if IBM equipment is used) or ASCII, and are either "labeled" (if the data is preceded by a tape header, typically containing a tape name and date), "unlabeled" (if the tape contains no header) or have a "non-standard label" (the tape has a header, but it does not conform to the format expected by the equipment used to read the tape).

Data is often written to the tape in blocks, instead of one record at a time. Between blocks, there is an interblock gap, which varies depending on the density, but is typically 5/8 to 3/4 of an inch long. To maximize the amount of data that is stored on a tape, the number of gaps has to be minimized. Additionally, data stored in blocks can be read and written more quickly than data stored one record at a time. The disadvantage is that data corruption within a block can cause multiple records to be lost.

== Examples ==
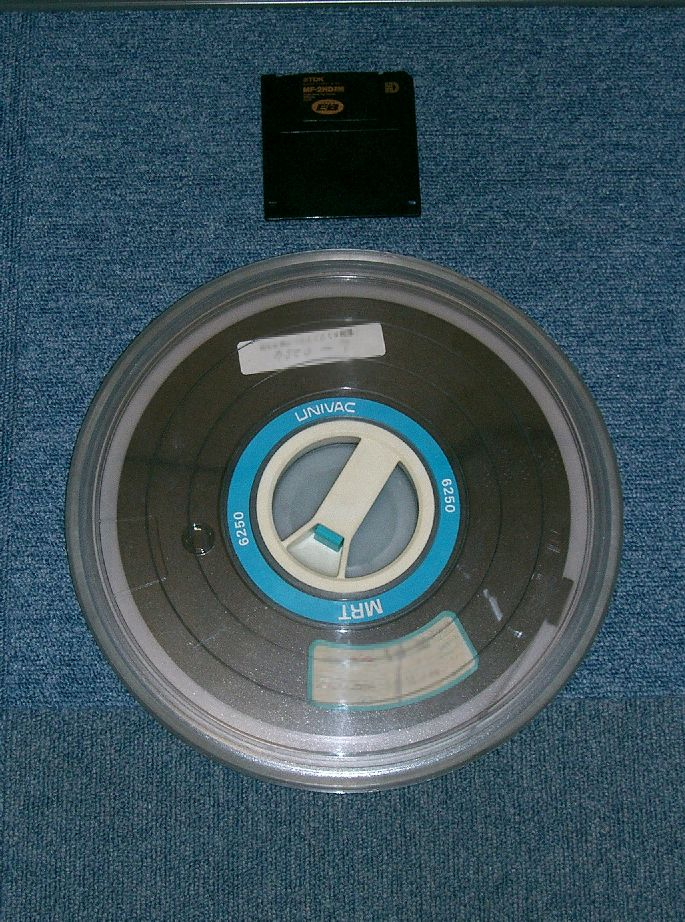
Full size 1/2" tape reel in protective case

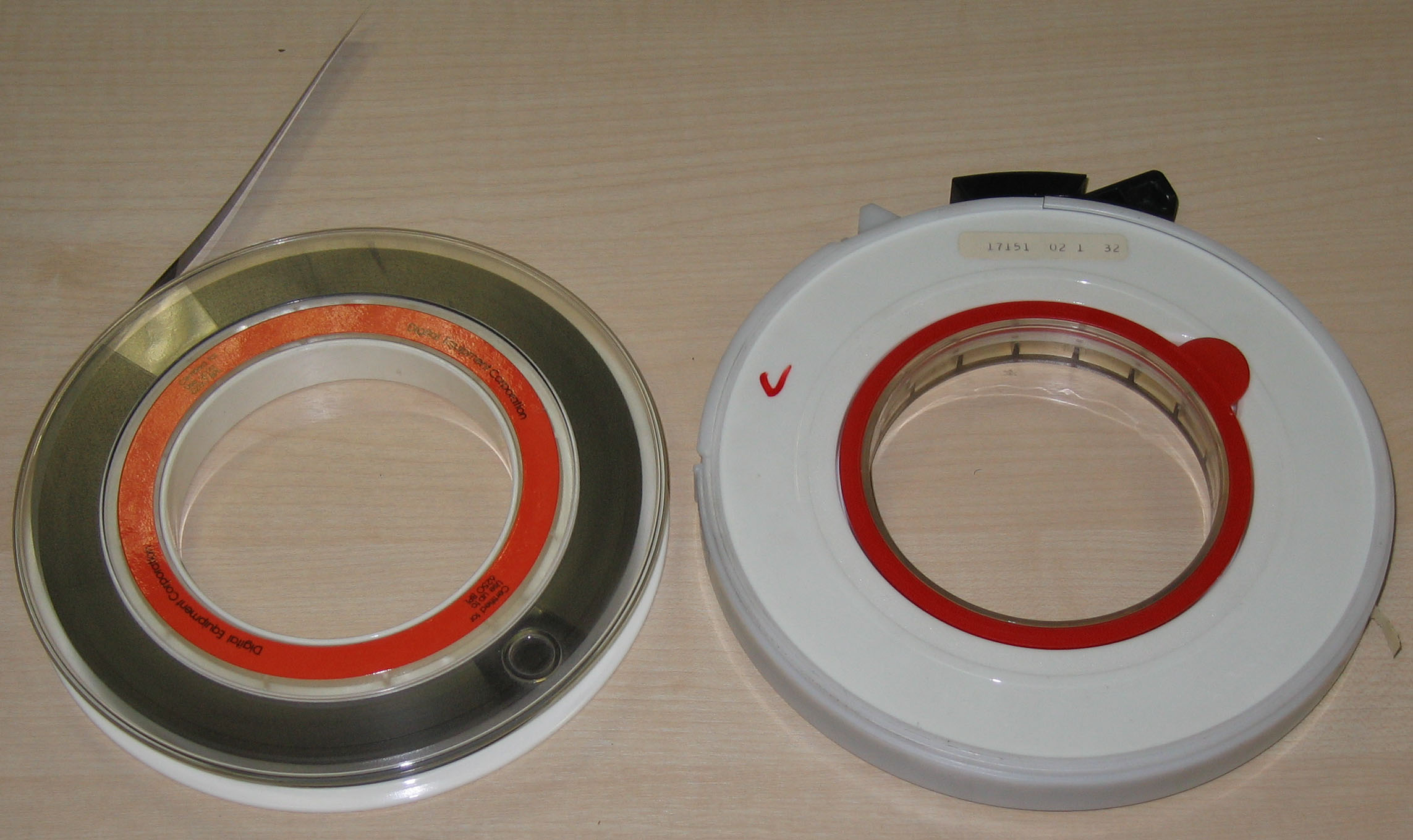
Two small 1/2" tapes, front and back

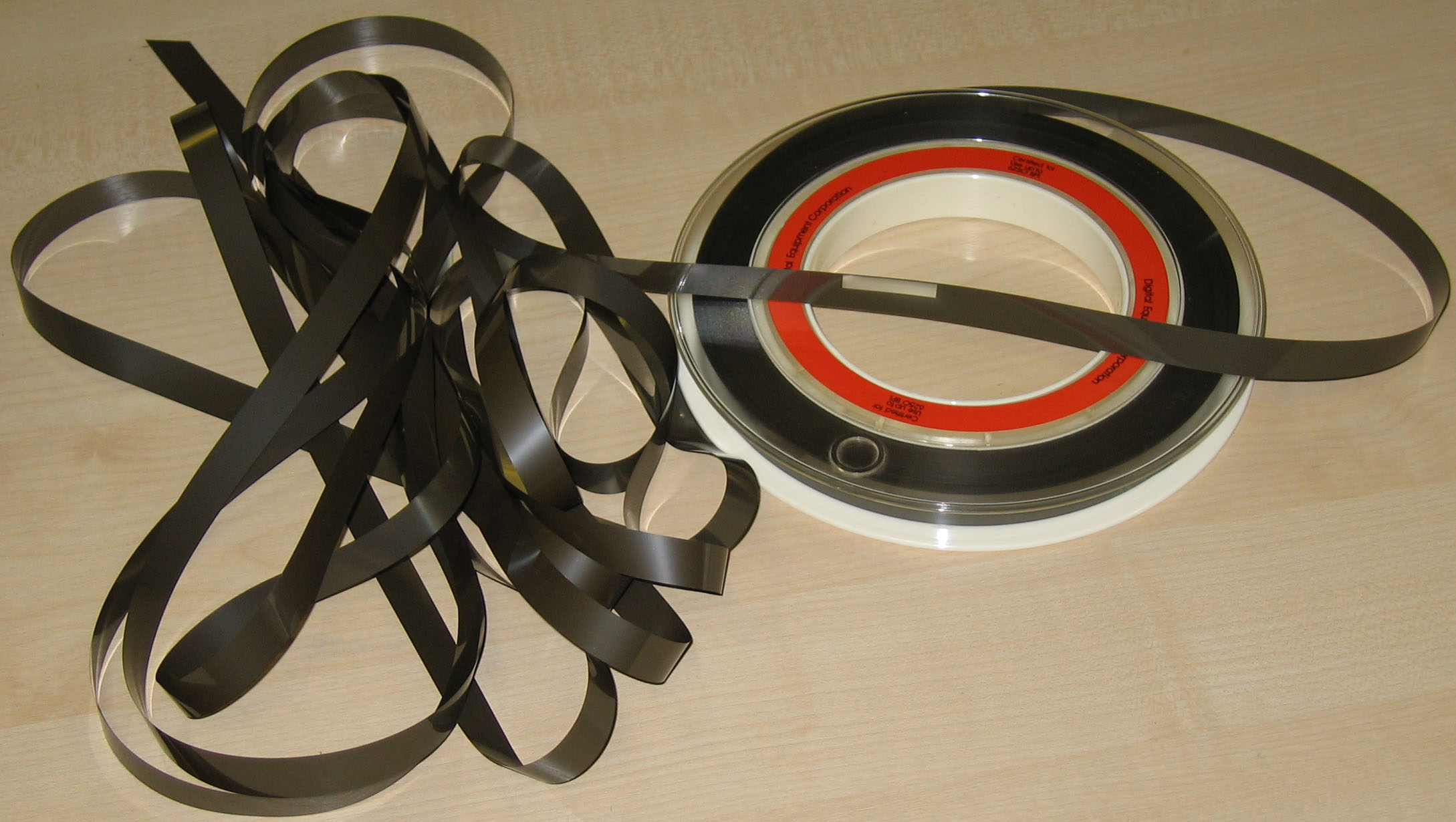
Aluminum foil strips mark the start and end of tape

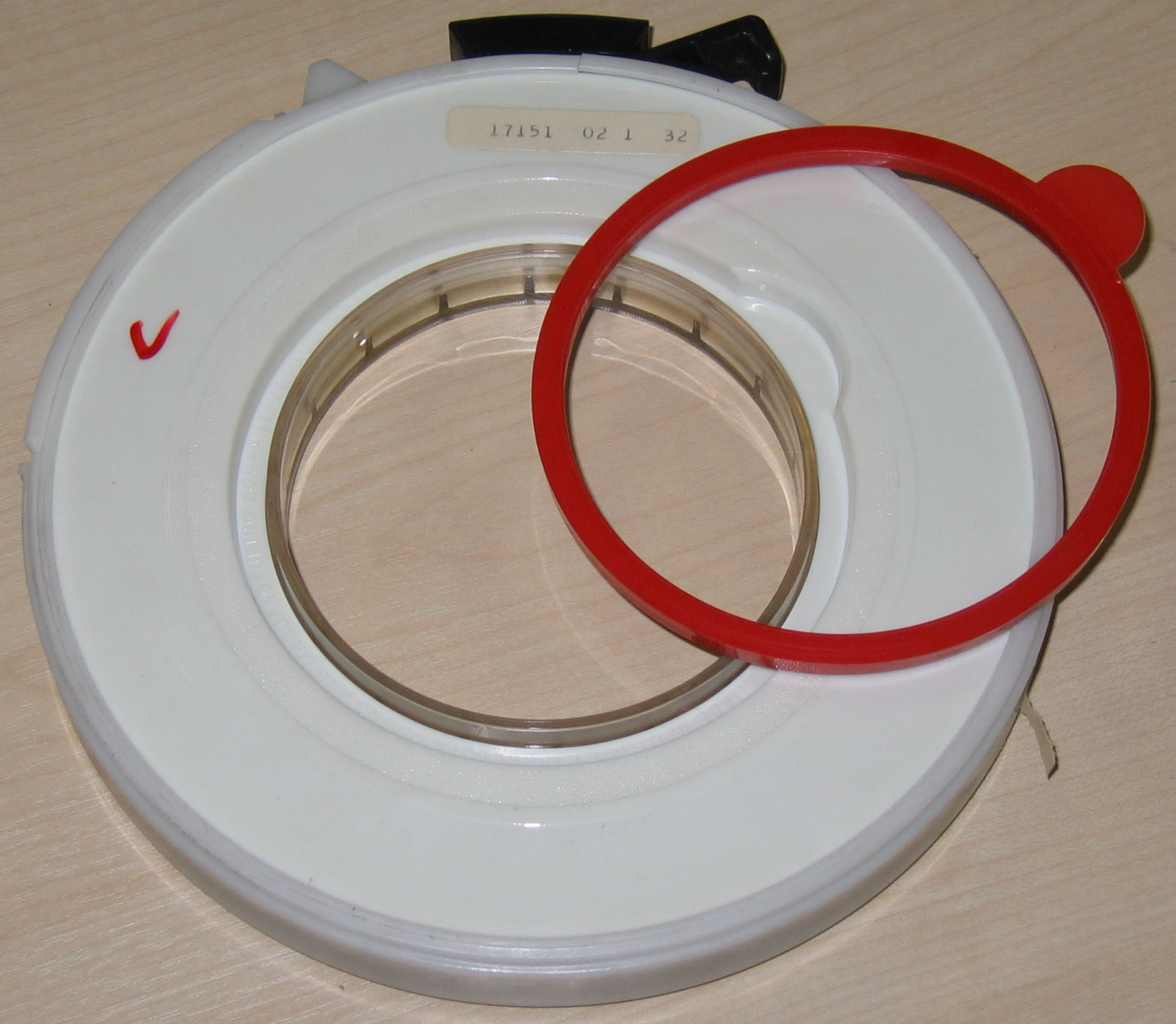
The write protection ring prevents the tape from being written when removed

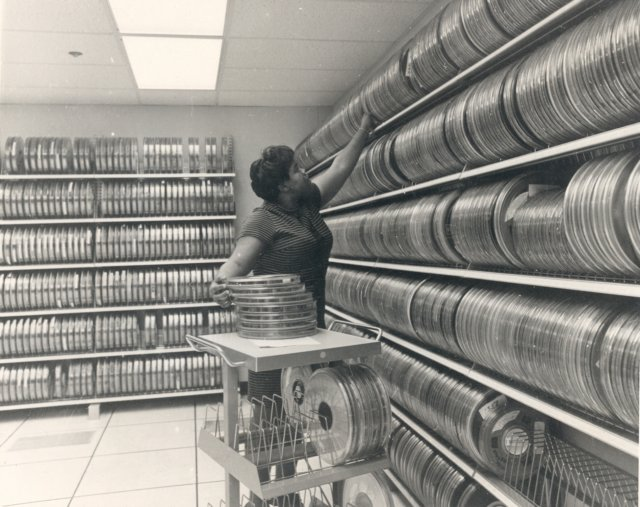
A typical library of half-inch magnetic tape

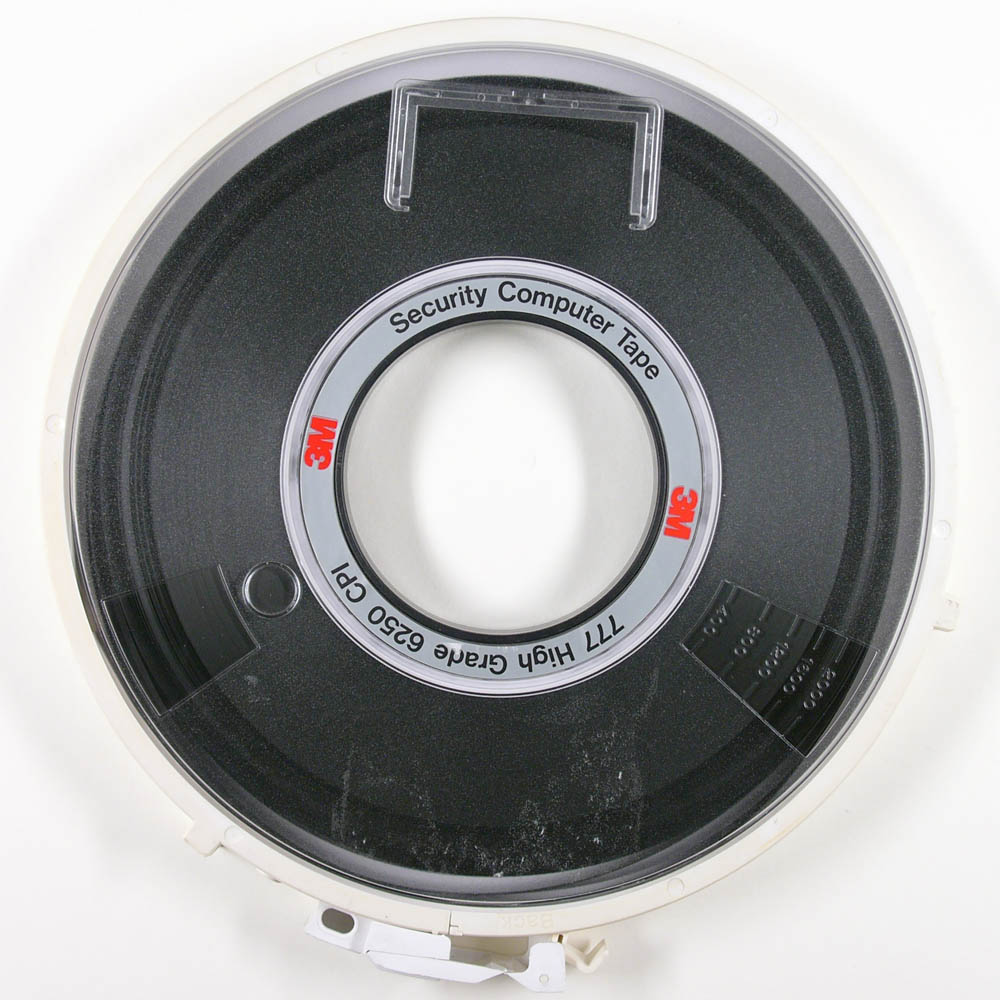
3M 777 High Grade 6250 CPI - Security Computer Tape

== Standards ==
- ANSI INCITS 40-1993 (R2003) Unrecorded Magnetic Tape for Information Interchange (9-Track, 800 cpi [characters per inch], NRZI; 1600 cpi, PE; and 6250 cpi, GCR)
- ISO/IEC 1863:1990 9-track, 12.7 mm (1/2 in)-wide magnetic tape for information interchange using NRZ1 at 32 ftpmm (flux transitions per millimeter, 800 flux transitions per inch or ftpi) or 32 cpmm (characters per millimeter, 800 characters per inch or cpi)
- ISO/IEC 3788:1990 9-track, 12.7 mm (1/2 in) wide magnetic tape for information interchange using phase encoding at 126 ftpmm (3,200 ftpi), 63 cpmm (1,600 cpi)
- ANSI INCITS 54-1986 (R2002) Recorded Magnetic Tape for Information Interchange (6250 cpi, Group Coded Recording)
- ANSI INCITS 27-1987 (R2003) Magnetic Tape Labels and File Structure for Information Interchange
- ECMA 62 - Data interchange on 12.7 mm 9-track magnetic tape

== Other drive manufacturers ==
- Ampex
- Anritsu
- Burroughs
- Cipher Data Products
- Control Data Corporation
- Digital Equipment Corporation
- Digi-Data
- Fujitsu
- Hewlett-Packard (incl. Dynec/Dymec)
- Kennedy
- Innovative Data Technology (IDT/Alston)
- Laser Magnetic Storage / Philips LMS / Plasmon LMS
- M4 Data
- Overland Data
- PerkinElmer
- Pertec Computer
- Qualstar
- SE Labs (EMI)
- STC / Storage Technology Corp, (StorageTek (STK) after name change), (acquired by SUN, now a division of Oracle Corp).
- Wangco

== Media manufacturers ==
- 3M (later spun off into Imation) — The first manufacturer of 9-track tape.
- Graham Magnetics — The last manufacturer to produce new 9-track tape (2001).
