= IBM 727 =

Early computer magnetic tape drive, 1953

The IBM 727 Magnetic Tape Unit was announced for the IBM 701 and IBM 702 on September 25, 1953. It became IBM's standard tape drive for their early vacuum-tube era computer systems. Later vacuum-tube machines and first-generation transistor computers used the IBM 729-series tape drive. The 727 was withdrawn on May 12, 1971.

== Overview ==
The tape had seven parallel tracks – six for data and one to maintain parity. Tapes with character data (BCD) were recorded in even parity. Binary tapes used odd parity. Reflective strips were glued several feet from the ends of the tape to serve as physical beginning and end of tape markers. Write protection is provided by a removable plastic ring in the back of the tape reel. Installing the ring enables writing, thus strictly speaking, it is a write enable ring, and removing it protects the tape from being written to.

tracks	6 data, 1 parity
chars/inch	200 characters/inch
Tape speed	75 inches/second
Rewind speed	500 inches/second (average)
Transfer rate	15,000 characters/second
Start time	5 milliseconds
Stop time	5 milliseconds
Width of tape	1/2 inches
Length of reel	2,400 feet
Composition	PET film (Mylar) or cellulose acetate base

== Gallery ==
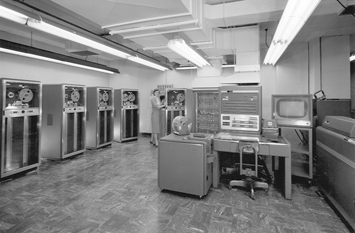
An IBM 704 mainframe with IBM 727 tape drives on the left. (image courtesy of LLNL)

Half-inch tape reel with write enable rings

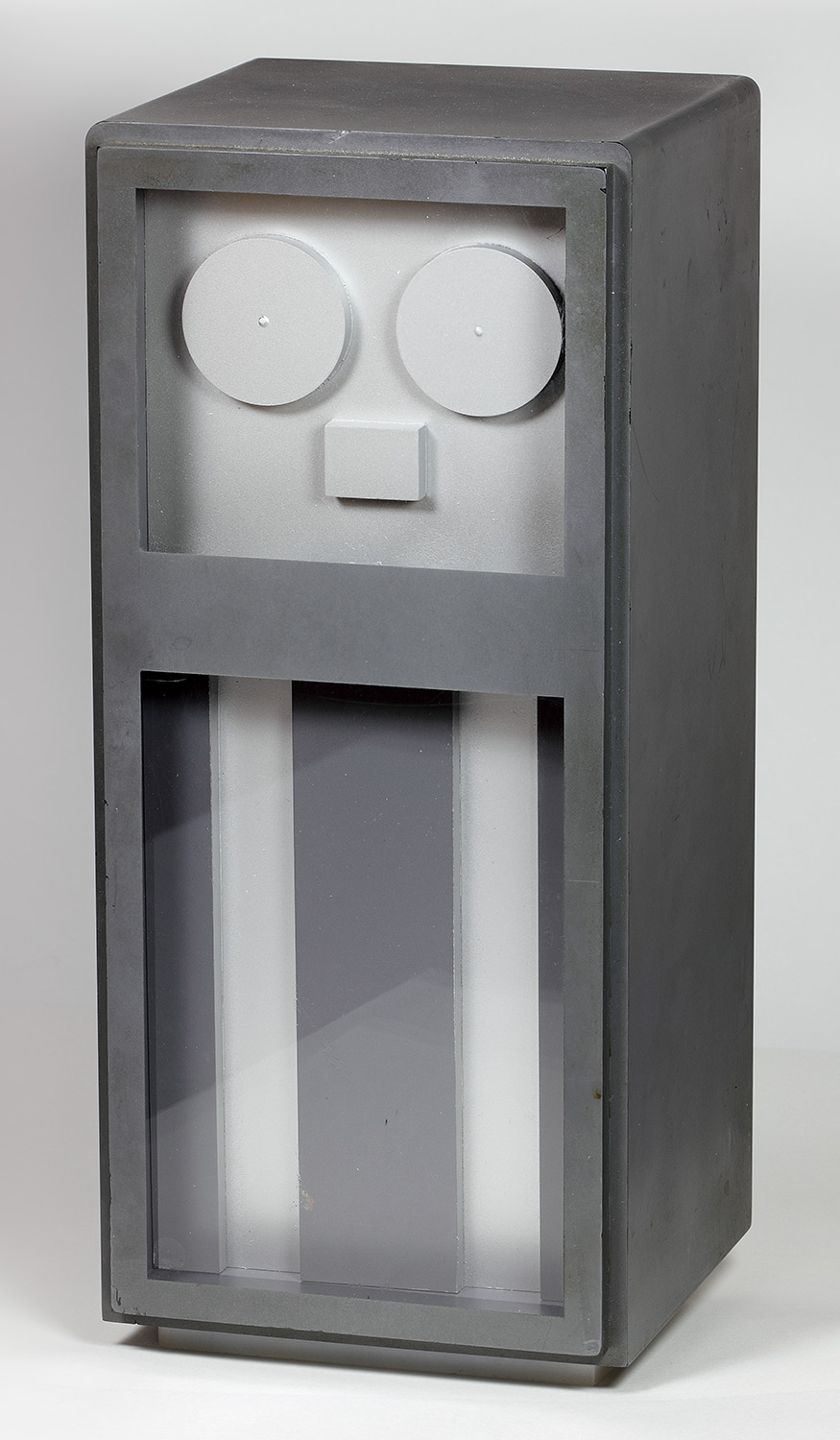
Model of an IBM 7272 tape drive
